= École centrale de Nantes =

French engineering school

École Centrale de Nantes
- Motto: Shake the future
- Type: Public, Graduate engineering
- Established: 1919
- Affiliations: Écoles Centrale Group,
- Director: Jean-Baptiste Avrillier
- Academic staff: 550
- Students: 2410 students
- Location: Nantes, France; 47°14′55″N 1°32′53″W
- Website: ec-nantes.fr

École Centrale de Nantes (French pronunciation: [ekɔl sɑ̃tʁal də nɑ̃t]), or Centrale Nantes, is a grande école – a French engineering school – established in 1919 under the name of Institut Polytechnique de l'Ouest. It provides Bachelor, Graduate, Master, Specialized Master, executive education and PhD Programmes based on the latest scientific and technological developments and the best management practices.

Centrale Nantes is a member of the Écoles Centrale Group, alongside its partner institutions CentraleSupélec, Centrale Lille, Centrale Lyon, Centrale Méditerranée, and Centrale Beijing. It is also a member of the TIME (Top Industrial Managers for Europe) network, that enables student exchanges among the leading engineering institutions in Europe.

== Location ==
The Centrale Nantes campus is situated in the heart of Nantes, France, in the Pays de la Loire region. Nantes is two hours by train from Paris. Nantes is the sixth largest city in France, located along the banks of the Loire 50 km away from the Atlantic coast.

== History ==
Centrale Nantes was founded in 1919 under the name Institut Polytechnique de l'Ouest. It was renamed École Nationale Supérieure de Mécanique (ENSM) in 1948 when it became an École Nationale Supérieure d'Ingénieurs. Thirty years later, the school moved to its current site on the banks of the River Erdre. In 1991, it became, by decree published in the Official Journal, the École Centrale de Nantes, joining the newly created Écoles Centrale Group. As a member of this group, it offers a Centralien multi-disciplinary engineering programme leading to the award of the French 'diplôme d'ingénieur', as well as programmes at undergraduate, Master's (including Erasmus Mundus Joint master's degrees), Advanced Master's, and PhD level. Executive Education programmes were introduced from 2017.

In 1993 the school became an 'EPCSCP', a public institution with a scientific, cultural and professional vocation. Centrale Nantes joined forces with Centrale Lille in 2006 within the Fondation Centrale Initiatives, and with Centrale Lyon in 2009 creating a joint subsidiary for the development of research: Centrale Innovation. In 2011, the school became a member of France AEROTECH. Centrale Nantes formed a structuring alliance with Audencia Business School in 2013 and ensa Nantes (Nantes School of Architecture) in 2014. In January 2022, Centrale Nantes became a component institution of the newly created Nantes University alongside the University of Nantes, Nantes University Hospital, Inserm, ensa Nantes, Nantes Saint-Nazaire School of Fine Arts and IRT Jules Verne.

== Reputation and rankings ==
Centrale Nantes is consistently mentioned among the top engineering schools in France in national and international rankings. According to the 2022 Times Higher Education World University Rankings by Subject, out of 1,118 establishments ranked worldwide for Engineering and Technology, Centrale Nantes is in the top 250 for 2022. This ranking places the school in third place amongst French engineering schools. In 2025, Centrale Nantes is ranked 102nd in the world and 4th in France for Mechanical Engineering and in the top 200 for Civil Engineering, also 4th in France.

Centrale Nantes has also been ranked in the top 25 global performing universities for student mobility since 2016.

Nationally, Centrale Nantes was ranked 4th French engineering school by L'Etudiant in 2021, and 7th in 2025

== Study ==
=== Undergraduate programmes ===
At undergraduate-level, three programmes are offered: a four-year BBA (Bachelor of Business Administration) Big Data and Management co-created with Audencia to offer a joint programme in engineering and management which is taught in English; a three-year Bachelor in Science in Engineering programme which opened in September 2023 and a one-year Foundation Master's programme which prepares bachelor-qualified students to meet the challenges of Centrale Nantes Master's programmes.

=== Engineering programme (diplôme d'ingénieur) ===
Centrale Nantes trains 420 students per year within its general engineering programme leading to the 'diplôme d'ingénieur' equivalent to a Master of Science and Engineering. This qualification is awarded to students after a total of five years of higher education. The admissions process is highly selective. French students with excellent high school results spend two years in the intensive 'classes préparatoires aux grandes écoles' preparing for the 'concours' – competitive entrance examinations to French engineering schools. Successful candidates then undertake three years of study at Centrale Nantes – corresponding to the senior undergraduate year and two graduate years. International students can join the engineering programme via the fast-track programme, or a double degree or exchange with one of Centrale Nantes partner institutions, or can apply via the Groupe des Écoles Centrale university entrance examination.

Students follow a multi-disciplinary core curriculum in their first year, followed by a choice of specialisation in each of their second and third years: Advanced Modelling and Analysis of Structures; Aeronautics; Civil Engineering; Computer Science for Information Systems; Computer Science for AI; Data Analysis and Applications in Signal and Image Processing; Digital Sciences for Life Sciences and Healthcare; Energy Control and Management; Energy Production and Management; Engineering Science for Housing and Urban Environment; Health, Innovation, Manufacturing; Industrial Engineering; Low-tech engineering; Mathematics and Applications; Mechanical Engineering for Materials and Manufacturing Processes; Ocean: Hydrodynamics and Marine Engineering; Product Engineering; Propulsion and Transport; Renewable energies and grid integration; Robotics; Smart positioning and sustainable mobility; Virtual Reality.

In their final year students also follow a professional option, honing in on a particular sector of activity or company function: Business Finance; Engineering and digital sciences for art, culture and heritage; Engineering for Ecological Transition; Entrepreneurship; Healthcare and Humanitarian Engineer; International Business Development; Personal Project; Proficiency in project management; Research and Development; Science and Music.

=== Master's programmes ===
Centrale Nantes offers six master's of science, technology and health – in marine technology, mechanical engineering, control and robotics, civil engineering, city and urban environment, and industrial engineering. A number of specialisms are proposed within each master's programme. They are taught in English.

- Marine Technology (M-TECH):
  - Hydrodynamics for Ocean Engineering (M-TECH HOE)
  - Atlantic Master on Ship Operation & Naval Engineering (M-TECH AMASONE)
    - École Navale and Centrale Nantes have joined forces to offer the Atlantique MAster in Ship Operations and Naval Engineering, an international master's degree given in English. This technical training in hydrodynamics and naval energy/propulsion is based on practical experience in ship piloting (part of the training is given on board French Navy ships) and places great emphasis on operational techniques. The AMASONE project has the originality to combine the complementarity of the two establishments and thus cover theory, experimentation and ship's conduct. The training includes a large part of experimental sciences and learning about naval operations, which constitutes a unique offer at this level in France and in Europe.
- Mechanical Engineering (M-ENG):
  - Advanced Manufacturing
  - Computational Mechanics
  - Energetics and Propulsion
  - Advanced Composite Engineering and Science
- Control and Robotics (CORO):
  - Signal and Image Processing
  - Advanced Robotics
  - Control Systems;
- Civil Engineering (C-ENG):
  - Materials and Structures in their Environment
- City and Urban Environments (U-ENV):
  - Atmosphere, Water and Urban Environment
  - Ambiances, Architecture, Urbanity
- Industrial Engineering (I-ENG):
  - Agile Factory Management
  - Smart and Connected Enterprise

==== Erasmus Mundus Joint Master Degrees (EMJMD) ====
An EMJMD is an, integrated, international study programme, jointly delivered by an international consortium of higher education institutions. EMJMDs award EU-funded scholarships to the best student candidates applying under annual selection rounds.

=== PhD ===
Opportunities exist for PhD study across numerous fields at Centrale Nantes in collaboration with two doctoral schools. Scientific production each year, on average, leads to 30 to 35 doctoral theses.

== Partnerships ==
Centrale Nantes collaborates with numerous industrial and educational partners within France as well internationally.

=== National partnerships ===
Centrale Nantes is a public institution and as such falls within the scope of the French Ministry of Higher Education and Research. The Ministry prepares and implements policy on the development of higher education and in the field of research and technology, and is responsible for the allocation of state resources and funds.

As one of the Écoles Centrale Group alongside CentraleSupélec, Centrale Lyon, Centrale Lille, Centrale Marseille and Centrale Beijing, Centrale Nantes offers students the possibility of an exchange with another Centrale establishment.

In 2014 the Alliance Centrale – Audencia – ensa Nantes was created, bringing together Centrale Nantes, Audencia Business School and l'École Nationale Supérieure d'Architecture de Nantes. This strategic alliance brings together engineering, business studies, architecture and design. The double degree programmes in 'Engineering and Management' and 'Engineering and Architecture' were also launched as part of the alliance.

Centrale Nantes has numerous additional French academic partners, listed below:

- École de design Nantes Atlantique
- IMT Atlantique
- École Navale
- École Supérieure d'Agriculture d'Angers
- ITII

=== International partnerships ===
Student mobility is fostered by Centrale Nantes' participation in international networks.

Centrale Nantes has a history of active participation in Erasmus+ Programmes: with notably four Erasmus Mundus Joint master's degree Programmes and numerous mobility programmes for higher education staff and students under key action 1. Within Key action 2, Centrale Nantes is and has been involved as a partner and or co-ordinator of numerous programmes.

Centrale Nantes currently has 178 academic partners across 48 different countries.

=== Industrial partnerships ===
Centrale Nantes has links with industrial partners, so that students can have opportunities such as internships.

== Research ==
Centrale Nantes researchers deploy an interdisciplinary approach to address three major challenges for growth and innovation: factory of the future, energy transition, and engineering for health.

=== Research laboratories ===
- Jean Leray Mathematical Institute
- Laboratory of Digital Sciences of Nantes (LS2N)
- Research Institute in Civil and Mechanical Engineering (GeM)
- Research Laboratory in Hydrodynamics, Energetics & Atmospheric Environment (LHEEA)
- Urban Architecture Nantes Research Centre (AAU)

=== Research facilities ===
- Ocean test facilities: Among the largest in a university setting in Europe, including a towing tank, a hydrodynamic and ocean engineering tank, a shallow water tank and a recirculating canal.
- SEM-REV Offshore test site: The first European site for multi-technology offshore testing that is connected to the grid.
- Dynamic and Static Test Centre (CRED): Testing the thermomechanical behaviour of materials applied to real situations
- Engine test benches: For the experimental characterization and numerical modelling of complex energy systems.
- Supercomputer: One of the most powerful in its category in France (Tier-2).
- Composites Platform: This experimental equipment makes it possible to produce organic composites and to characterize materials in physical terms.
- Rapid Manufacturing Platform: Bringing together several manufacturing processes: additive manufacturing, machining, forming, welding, bioprinting.
- Robotics Platform: Three fields of robotics are explored via the platform: production, land and air mobile robotics, and humanoid robotics and natural interactions.
- Structural Testing Floor: Bringing together simulation tools adapted for design and management of the lifecycle of structures.
- Smart Factory Platform: A reconfigurable production platform demonstrating factory of the future concepts.
- Virtual Reality: This immersive room is equipped with a passive 3D projection system for real-time complex model simulation.
- Wind Tunnels: An atmospheric wind tunnel and an aerodynamic wind tunnel.
- Electric Vehicle Test Bench

=== Industrial research chairs ===
Centrale Nantes is actively involved in the creation of international chairs with its partners:

- ESI Group on Advanced Numerical Methods
- Mann+Hummel on Clean Energy Vehicles
- TNO on Coastal Atmosphere
- Renault–LMS, A Siemens Business on Combustion Engines
- EADS on Composites for Aeronautics and Space
- Faurecia on Composites for Automotive Applications
- PSA Group on Digital Simulation
- Renault on Electric Vehicles
- EDYCEM on Innovative Concrete
- Naval Group (Joint Laboratory of Marine Technology – Centrale Nantes, University of Nantes) on Naval Military Technologies
- Bureau Veritas on Ships of the Future
- RTE on Smart Grids

== Alumni ==
Centrale Nantes Alumni is the alumni network of Centrale Nantes. Dating back to 1922, it has over 20,000 alumni today. It organises over 500 events per year.

Centrale Nantes Alumni is a member of the wider Centralien network which allows for joint actions for the whole Centrale community (Lille, Lyon, Nantes, Marseille, CentraleSupélec) in France and in 44 other countries.

== See also ==
- Écoles Centrale Group
- French Grandes écoles
- Education in France
- Nantes
