= Centrale Graduate School =

French graduate school of engineering

Écoles Centrales Group
- Groupe des Écoles Centrales
- Type: Public, Grandes écoles
- Established: 1990
- Administrative staff: 2900
- Students: 10,000
- Doctoral students: 800
- Location: Lille, Lyon, Marseille, Nantes, Paris, (France)
- Research labs: 38
- Website: https://www.groupe-centrale.com/

Ecoles Centrales Network

The Écoles Centrales Group (Occitan: Grop de Las Escòlas Centrals) is an alliance, consisting of following grandes écoles of engineering:

- CentraleSupélec (formed by merger of École Centrale Paris and Supélec) established in 2015
- École centrale de Lille established in 1854
- École centrale de Lyon established in 1857
- Centrale Méditerranée established in 1891
- École centrale de Nantes established in 1919
- École centrale de Pékin in China, established in 2005.
- École centrale de Casablanca in Morocco, established in 2013
- Mahindra École Centrale in Hyderabad, India, established in 2014

The Group contributes to the harmonisation of academic programs, the sharing of experiences, and collaboration in international relations. A key stakeholder in corporate development, the Écoles Centrales Group has established a reputation as a global reference point in the education of the generalist engineers of tomorrow.

With about 10,000 graduate engineer students and 800 PhD doctorate students, a total faculty of 700 permanent academic members, 2200 part-time lecturers and associate professors, 450 technical and administrative staff, 2000 researchers, the Écoles Centrales Group annually approves hundreds of PhD doctorate dissertations and grants 1500 Centrale graduate engineering degrees and other master's degrees. Already more than 100,000 Centrale alumni are active today in business, entrepreneurship, research & development, and management in small and large industries worldwide.

== Goals ==
- multidisciplinary curriculum for engineers, with a broad scope of scientific, engineering and management fields taught to all students (civil engineering; mechanical engineering; electrical engineering; information theory & computer science; control science and signal processing; telecom; chemistry, physics and material sciences; micro-nano technologies; manufacturing; safety, logistics; mathematics; economics; statistics, finance; management ...) applicable for French-speaking students with a solid scientific background knowledge and intellectual agility;
- first two years for acquisition of a Centrale common body of knowledges, with core and elective thematic flexibility, and at least one year of in-depth thematic studies at the end of the programme;
- close contact with the industry through joint projects and training periods, and requirements for international exposure;
- academic education and applied research closely related to industry stakeholders.

== Admission ==
Education programmes implemented in CentraleSupélec, Lille, Lyon, Marseille and Nantes include

- Ingénieur Centralien (Centrale graduate engineering degree)
- Masters and PhD doctorate studies
- Specialized masters (Mastère MS Spécialisé)

The Centrale Programme (Centrale graduate engineering degree - Grade 300 ECTS) includes a three or four-year curriculum. Application to the Centrale Programme is possible after two/three year undergraduate studies in other educational institutes. Admission to an école centrale requires success in either:

- a French nationwide selective exam with numerus clausus : concours Centrale-Supelec, with examination centres located throughout France and in Lebanon, Morocco, Tunisia;
- an entrance exam for Bachelor of Science : CASTing - Concours d'Admission sur Titre Ingénieur;
- a selection process as per TIME double degrees procedures applicable in Europe;
- a selection process as per TIME Overseas double degree procedures applicable for selected universities in Brasil, Canada, Chile, China, Indonesia, Japan, USA;
- a specific application process for other international students presented by their originating University.

Thus undergraduate studies + the Centralien Programme account for more than a cumulated 300 ECTS credit in the European education system.

Admission to the master's degree programme (workload is either M1+M2 = 120 ECTS or M2 = 60 ECTS) is possible upon application assessment based on academic criteria or is possible as a part of the Centralien Programme. Several master's degrees are available from the different écoles centrales and may be taught in English and/or French, targeting diverse science and engineering domains :

- Master's degrees at Centrale Lille
- Master's degrees at Centrale Lyon
- Master's degrees at Centrale Marseille
- Master's degrees at Centrale Nantes
- Master's degrees at Centrale Paris

Admission to specialized master's degree programmes (Mastère spécialisé) for master's-level specialization and continuing education in specific engineering and management fields (workload is 75 ECTS) is possible upon application assessment based on candidate profile. MS taught in French include :

- MS Centrale Lille
- MS Centrale Lyon
- MS Centrale Marseille
- MS Centrale Nantes
- MS Centrale Paris

== Research labs ==
PhD candidates and visiting researchers should contact directly their preferred labs among 38 different research labs of the Écoles Centrales.

CARNOT Institute affiliations :

- CentraleSupélec labs are a member of CARNOT C3S Institute.
- École Centrale de Lille labs are a member of CARNOT ARTS Institute.
- École Centrale de Lyon labs are a member of CARNOT i@L Institute.

== See also ==
- TIME Network
