= Robert Castaigne =

French businessman (born 1946)

- Born: 1946 (age 79–80)
- Education: École centrale de Lille
- Occupation: Businessman

Robert Castaigne (born 1946) is the chief financial officer of Total S.A. He has held the position since 1990. He is a graduate engineer from École centrale de Lille, with further specialization at the École nationale supérieure du pétrole et des moteurs. He also holds a doctorate in economics.
