= LIFL =

LIFL may refer to:

- Laboratoire d'Informatique Fondamentale de Lille, a computer science research laboratory of Lille University of Science and Technology.
