= École Centrale de Lille =

Graduate engineering school in Villeneuve d'Ascq, Lille metropolis, France

- Type: Public, graduate engineering
- Established: 1854-1872
- Affiliations: Centrale Graduate School; Community of Universities and Institutions (COMUE) Lille Nord de France; ASTech aerospace cluster I-Trans railways cluster
- Students: 1300
- Location: Villeneuve-d'Ascq - European Metropolis of Lille, Hauts-de-France; 50°36′23″N 3°8′11″E
- Research labs: 7
- Colors: Blue; Orange
- Website: centralelille.fr

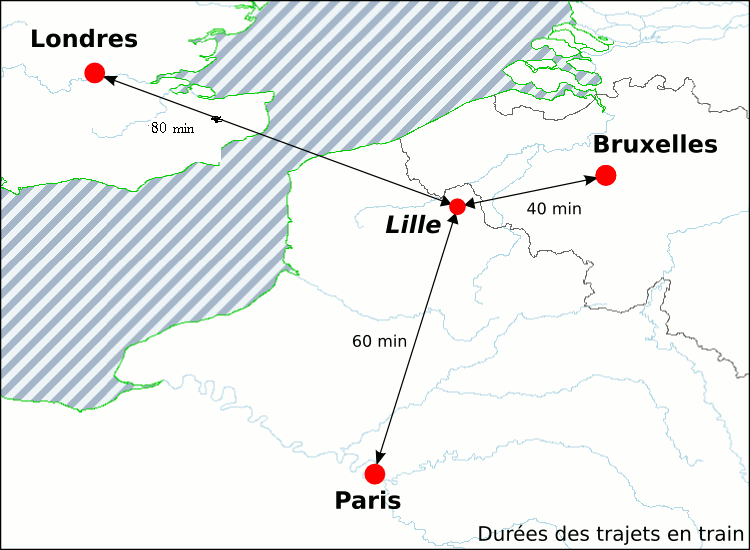
École Centrale de Lille (France) - location in Europe

École Centrale de Lille (French pronunciation: [ekɔl sɑ̃tʁal də lil], lit. 'Central School of Lille') is a graduate engineering school, with roots back to 1854 as the École des arts industriels et des mines de Lille, re-organised in 1872 as Institut industriel du Nord. It is one of the Centrale Graduate Schools.

Its different curricula lead to the following French and European degrees:

- Ingénieur Centralien de Lille (Centralien Graduate engineer Masters program with EUR-ACE EURopean ACcredited Engineer label)
- Masters Recherche & Doctorat (PhD doctorate studies)
- Mastères Spécialisés (MS) (Specialized Masters)
- Massive open online course in project management.

Academic activities and industrial applied research are performed mainly in French and English languages. Students from a dozen of nationalities participate to the different curricula at École Centrale de Lille.

Most of the 1,300 graduate engineer students at École Centrale de Lille live in dedicated residential buildings nearby research labs and metro public transports on a science and technology campus (Cité Scientifique) that is shared with 20,000 students from the University of Lille.

The school is located on the campus of Science and Technology (Cité Scientifique) of the University of Lille in Villeneuve-d'Ascq (European Metropolis of Lille - Hauts-de-France).

== History ==
École Centrale de Lille was founded as École des arts industriels et des mines de Lille in 1854, the same year when Louis Pasteur became the dean of Faculté des sciences de Lille and pioneered applied research with industry cooperations, with support of scientists such as Charles Frédéric Kuhlmann. Between 1854 and 1871, students attending the two-year curriculum grew to 90 per annum. Baccalaureate was a prerequisite to admission to the engineering school.

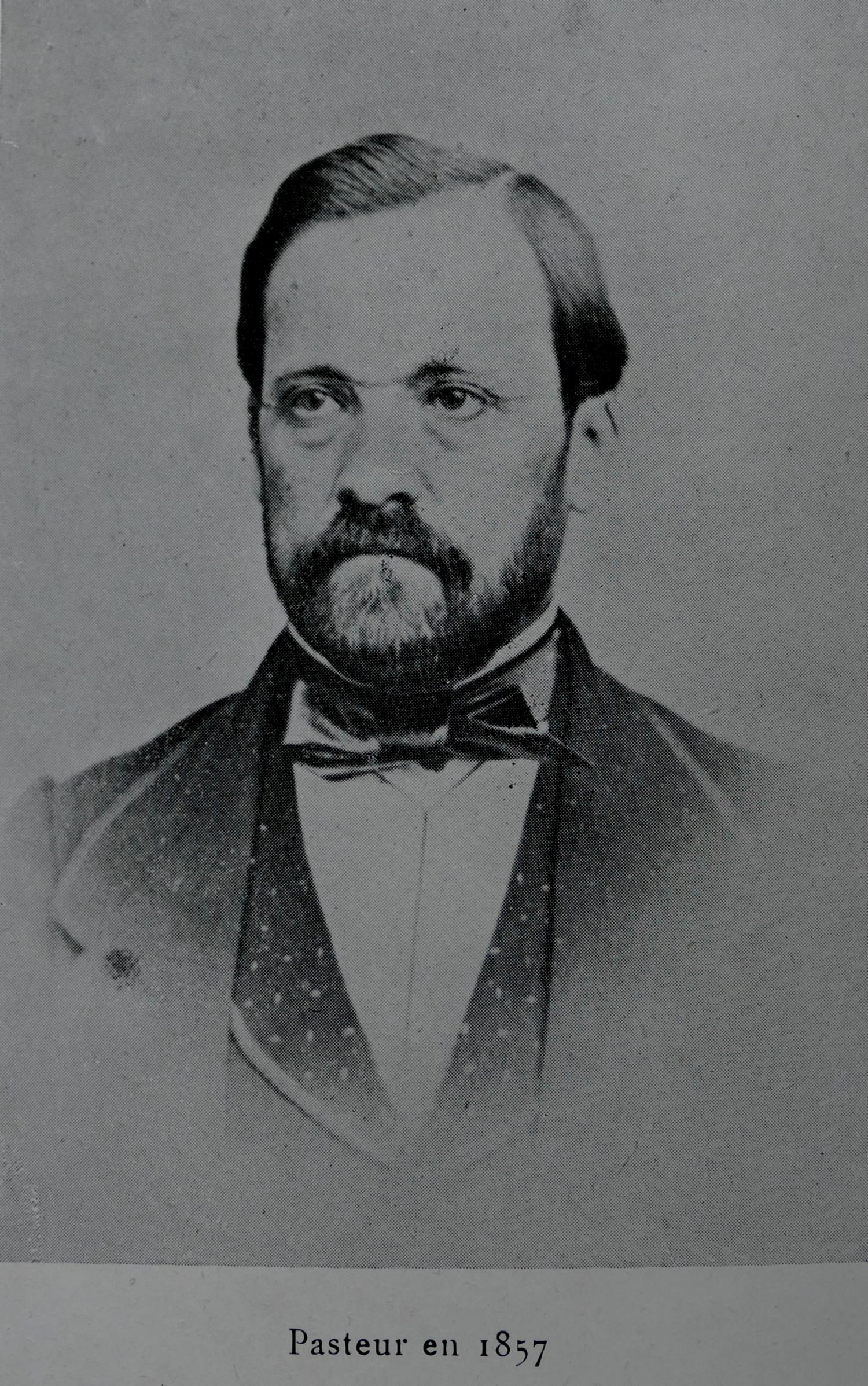
Louis Pasteur, dean of the faculty of sciences de Lille

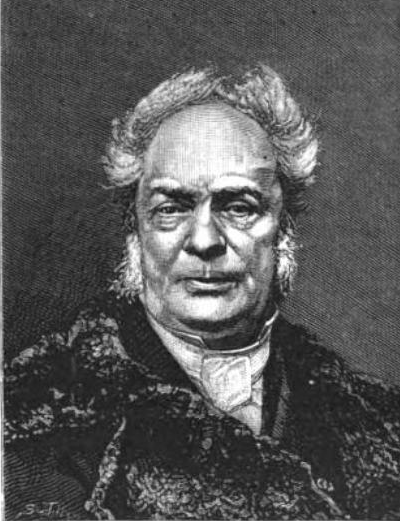
Charles Frédéric Kuhlmann

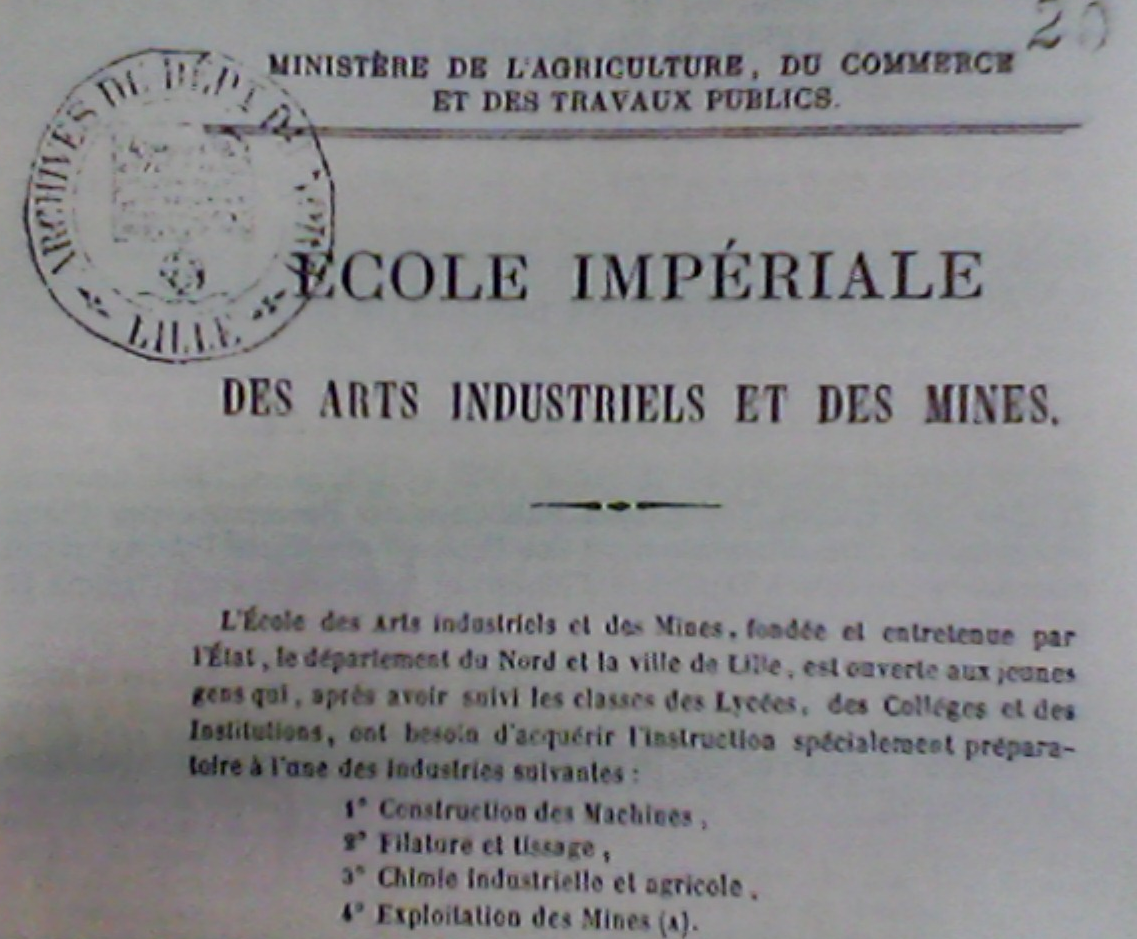
École impériale des arts industriels et des mines

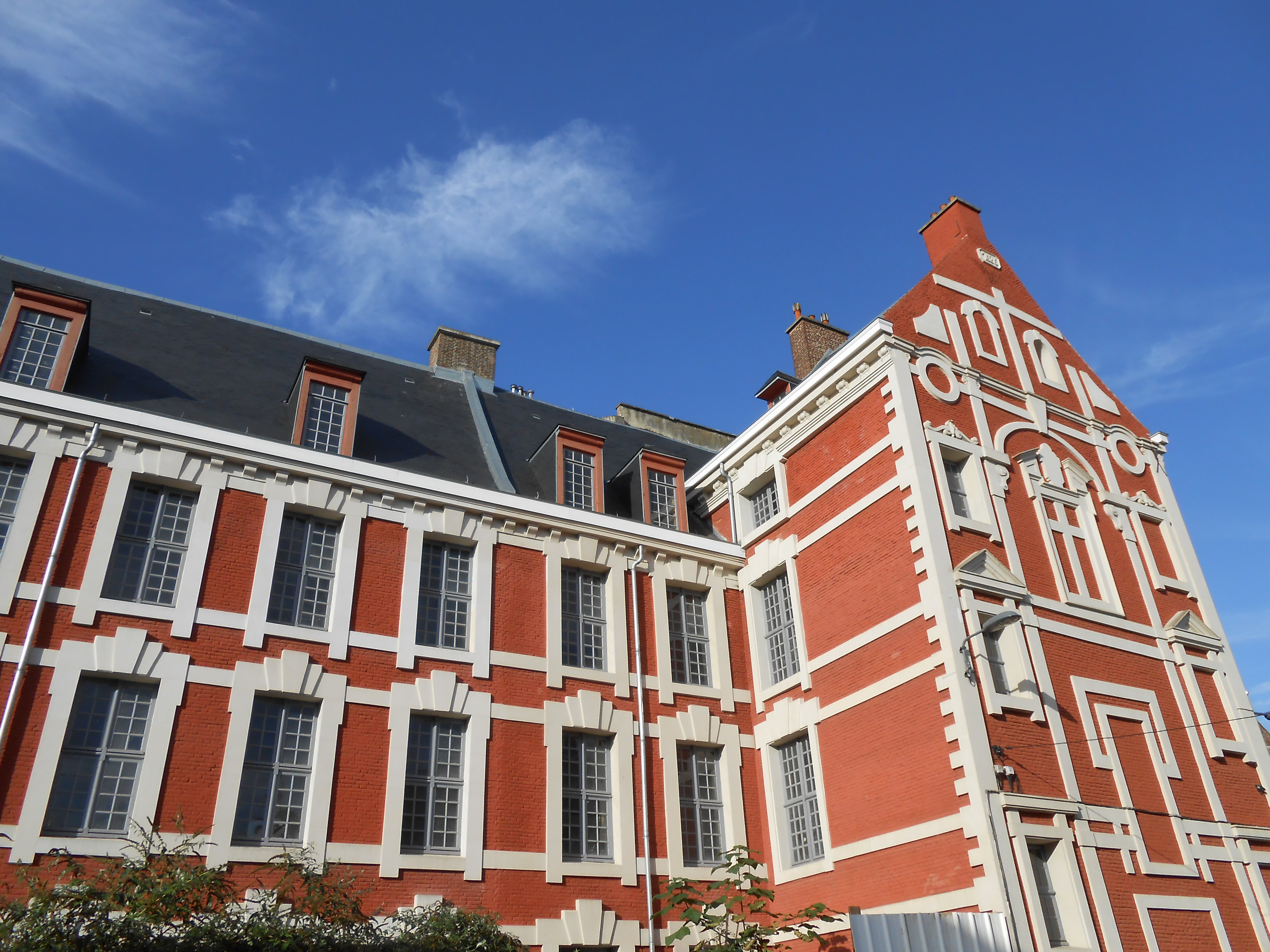
Historical building from 1854 to 1875

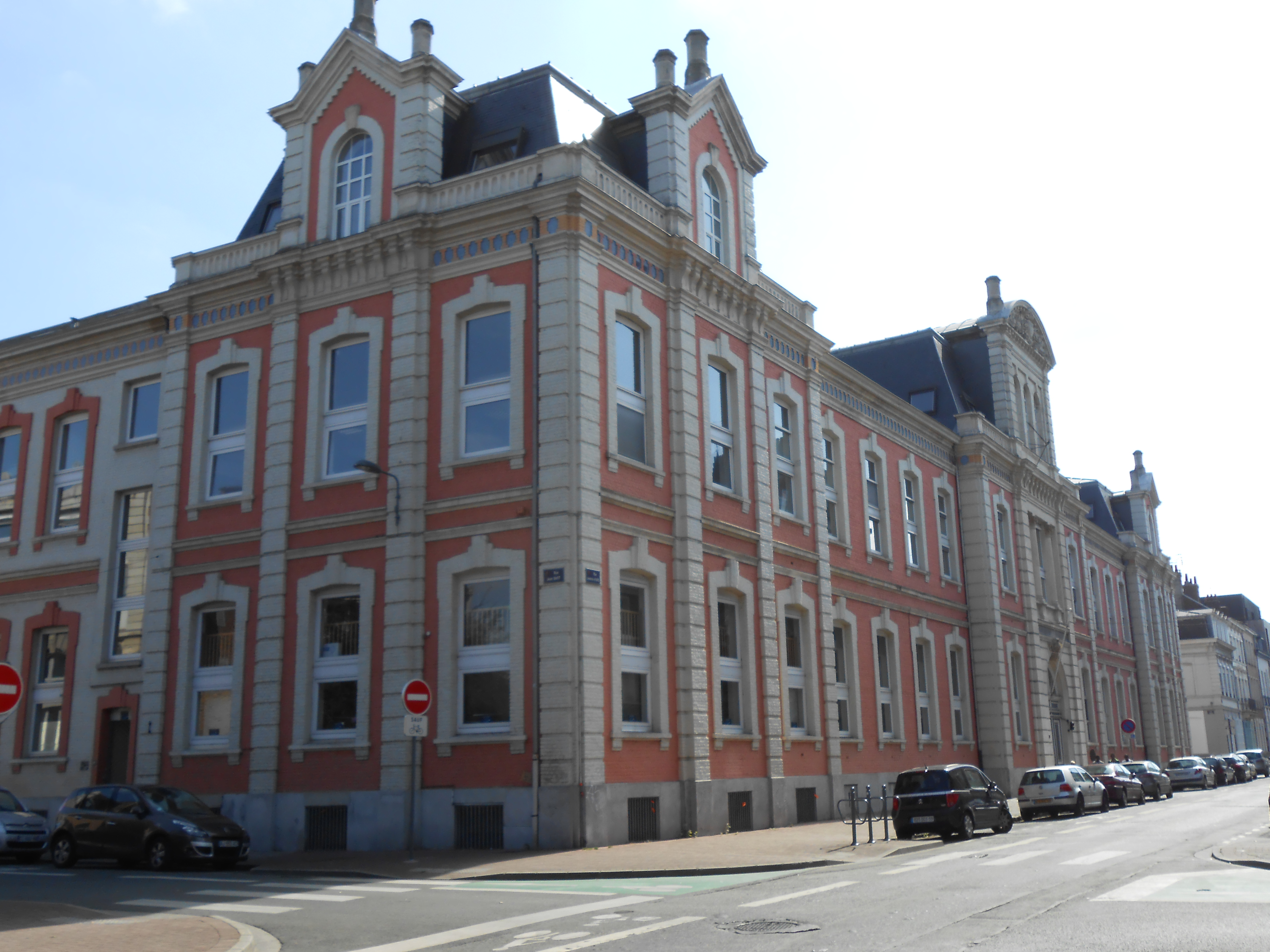
Institut industriel du Nord, 1875 to 1968

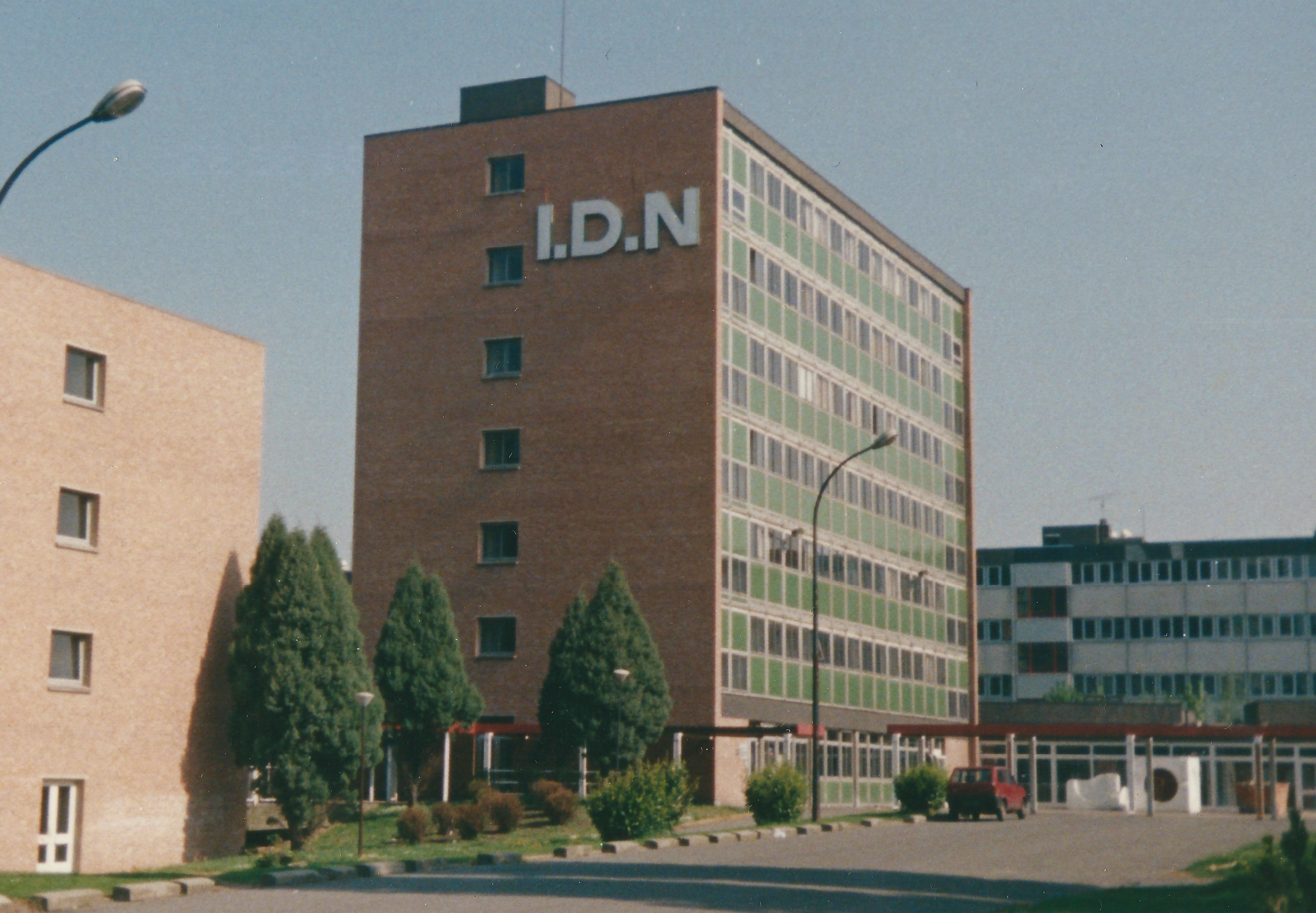
Centrale Lille - Institut industriel du Nord (IDN tower in 1991)

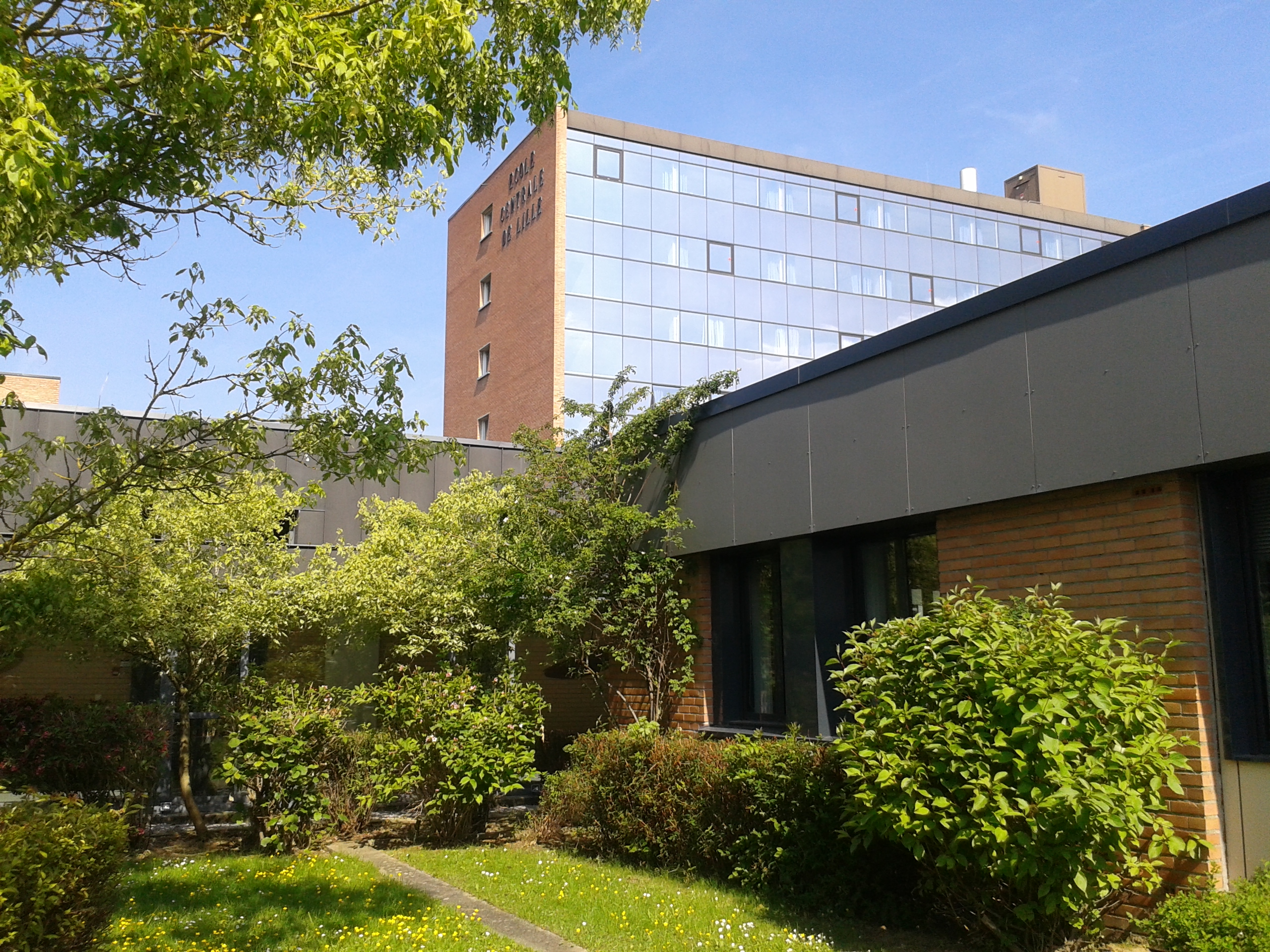
Centrale Lille faculty tower since 1968

In 1872 lectures and research activities in the engineering school were reorganised into a three-year curriculum and developed within its Institut industriel du Nord, with a focus on civil engineering, mechanical engineering, chemistry and manufacturing engineering. Electrical engineering full courses were added in 1892, automobile design has been taught from 1899 onwards. More than 200 students graduated in year 1914. Aerodynamics studies started in 1930. A stress on automatic control and computers was initiated in 1957. Later came courses and research in computer science, supply chain management, materials science, micro-electronics and telecommunications.

Since early 20th century, student admission has been based on a competitive exam after attending a classe préparatoire aux grandes écoles or similar undergraduate studies.

École Centrale de Lille was originally located in Lille central district from 1854 to 1875. Larger buildings with dedicated laboratories were inaugurated in 1875 nearby the Faculté des sciences de Lille. It then moved in 1968 in the modern campus of Lille University of Science and Technology (Cité Scientifique), in the south-east suburb of Lille.

== Admission ==
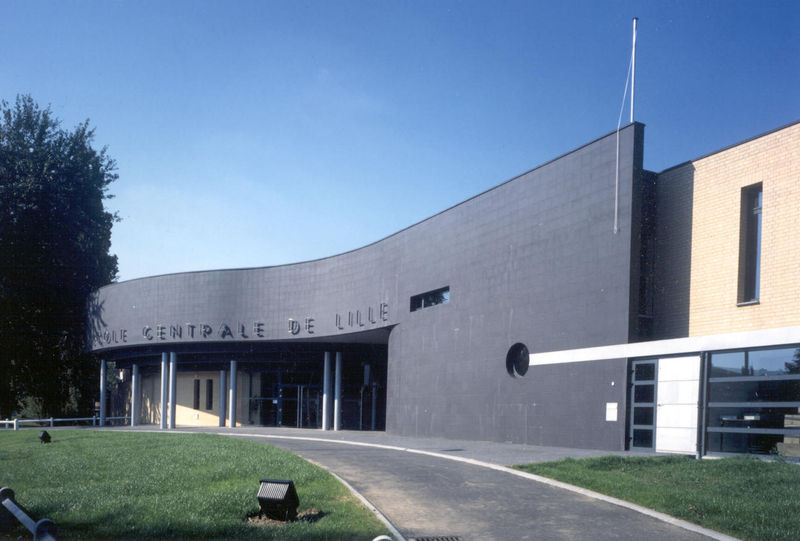
École Centrale de Lille - Administration hall

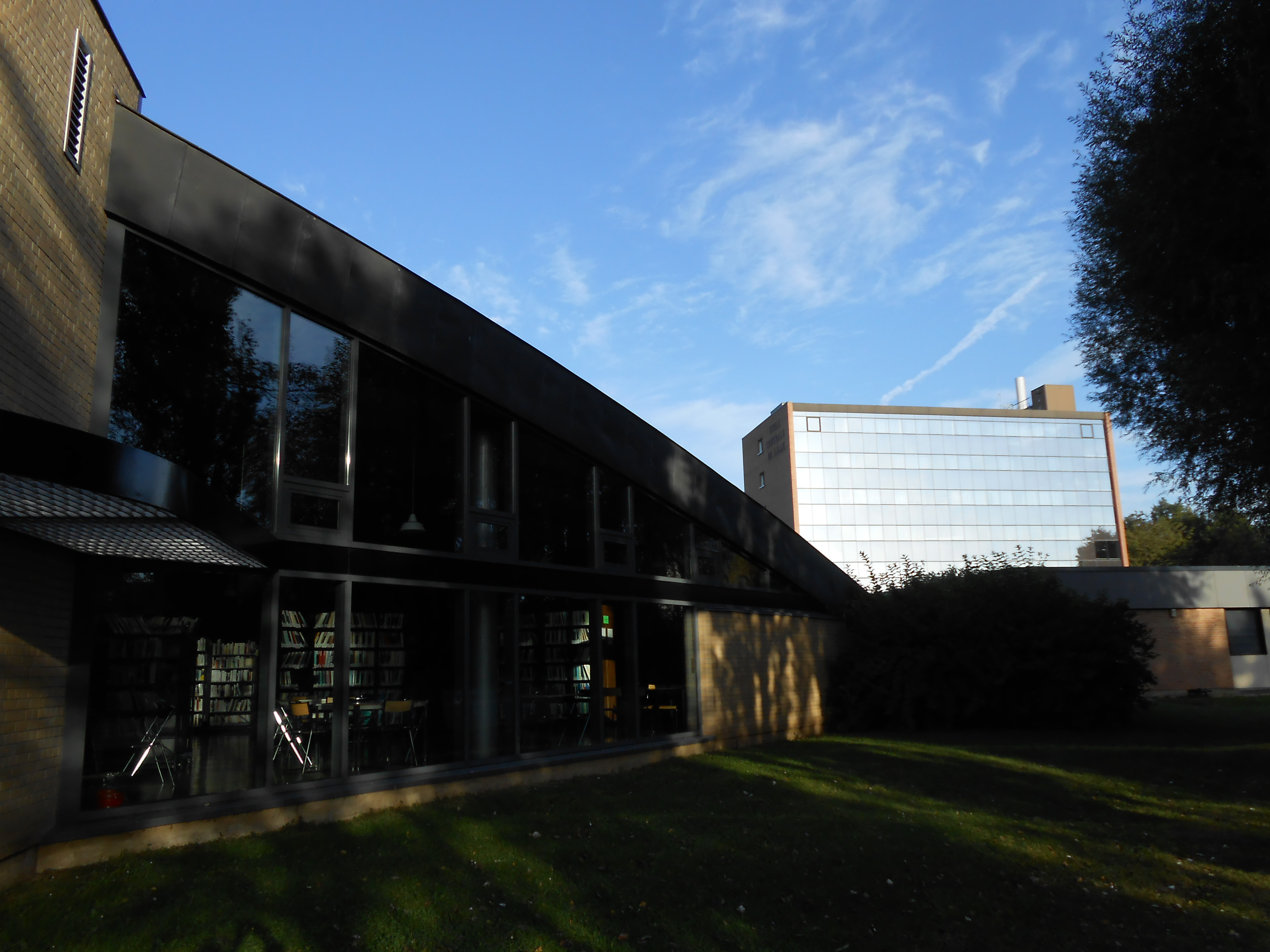
Ecole Centrale de Lille

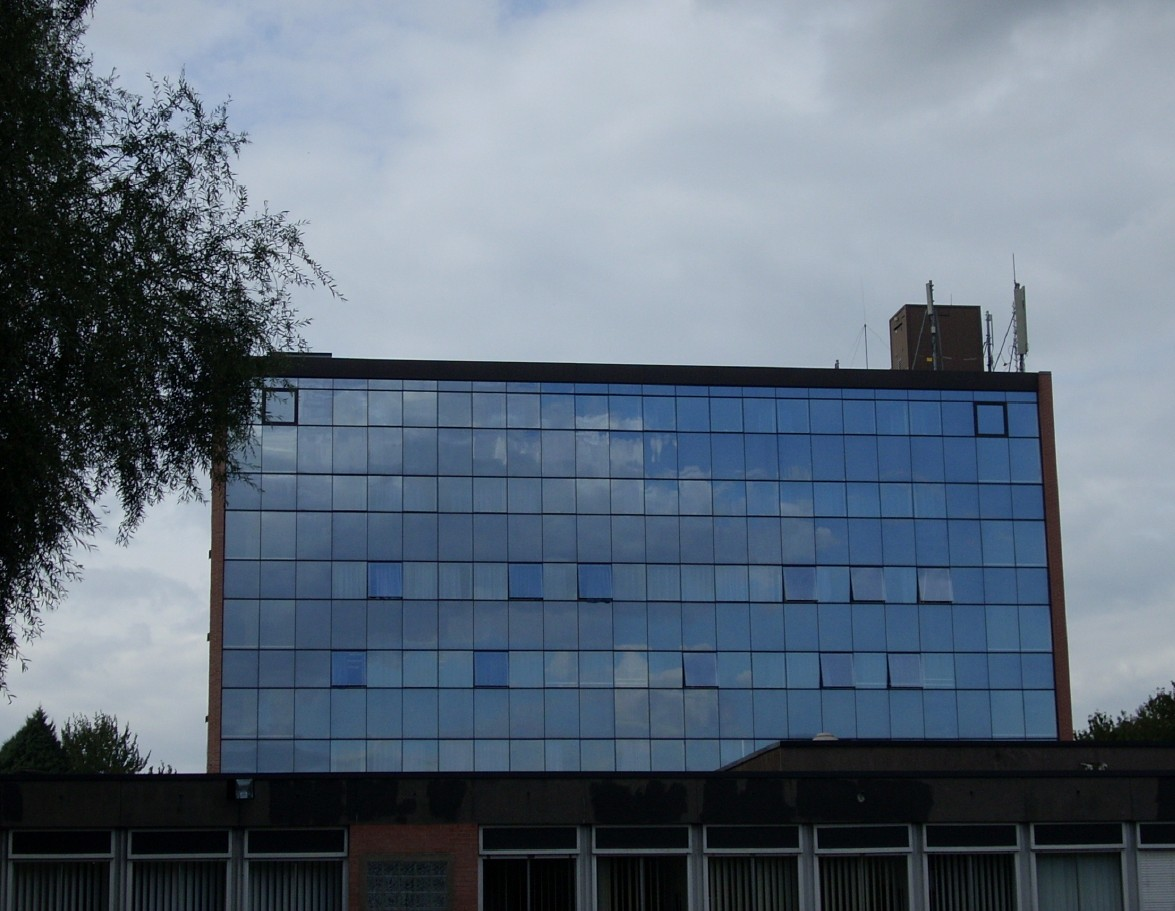
École Centrale de Lille - Building E

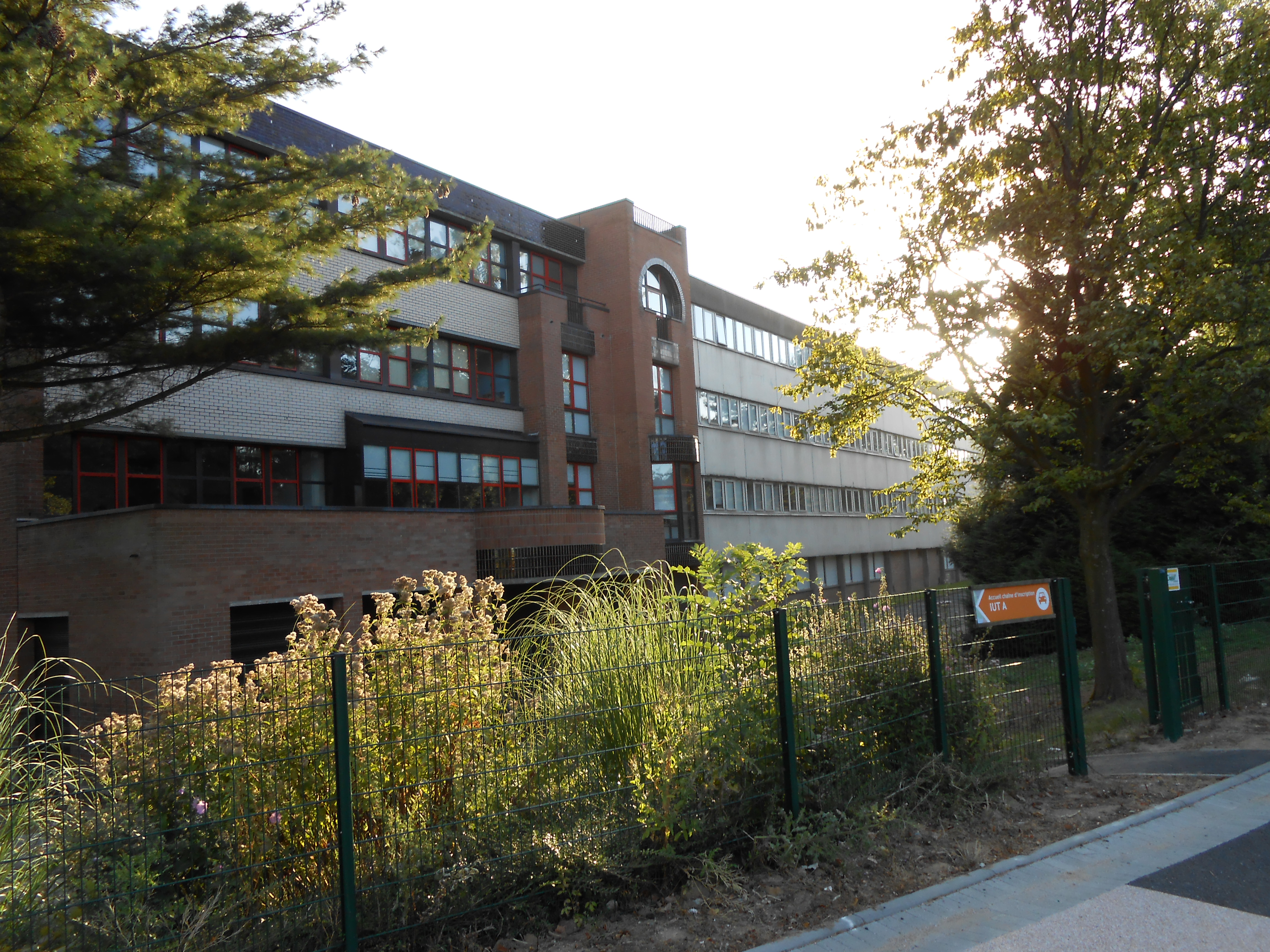
École Centrale de Lille - Building C

Admission to the Centralien engineering Programme implemented at École Centrale de Lille is possible after two/three year scientific undergraduate studies and requires success to either:

- an admission exam for the Bachelor of Science degree : CASTing - Concours d'Admission sur Titre Ingénieur (2-year curriculum)
- a French nationwide selective exam with numerus clausus : concours Centrale-Supelec (3-year curriculum including at least 2 years in France)
- a selective application as per TIME double degrees procedures applicable in Europe (2+2-year curriculum, including 2 years in France)
- a selective application as per TIME Overseas double degree procedures applicable for selected Universities and Institutes of Technology in Brasil, Canada, Chile, China, Indonesia, Japan, Korea (2+2-year curriculum, including 2 years in France)
- a selective application as per IMCC procedure for one-semester or one-year accredited postgraduate study period in France and US (1 year curriculum)
- a specific application process for other international students presented by their originating university.

The Centralien Programme typically lasts three years and results in a master's degree, augmented with international experience. Thus undergraduate studies + the Centralien Programme account for more than a cumulated 300 ECTS credit in the European education system.

However, graduate students enrolled in the TIME double degree procedure are required to spend two-years at École Centrale de Lille and spend two years in the TIME-partner institute for a total of four years resulting in a double master's degree.

Not to mention that 18% students attending courses at École Centrale de Lille are international students, all students enrolled in the Centralien Programme have an international exposure with opportunities to perform industry training and internship in enterprises worldwide, study abroad for 1 year in selected partner institutes providing Master (M2) courses, or be part of the 2+2 year TIME double degree programme.

In addition to the Centralien Programme, École Centrale de Lille provides a range of master's degree cursus in science and engineering that are opened to applicants who have completed their undergraduate studies in other institutes. Admission to Masters' second-year research cursus (M2R) is also possible for applicants who have performed their Master's first year (M1) in another institute and wish to focus on a research topic associated to Centrale Lille research labs.

Admission to one of the 6 Masters (M1+M2 or M2) from École Centrale de Lille is possible upon an application assessment process based on academic criteria. Note that Masters/Research (M2R) workload is 60 ECTS credits and may be the starting point for doctorate studies. These 6 Masters and a larger number of Masters (M2) from other Centrale Graduate Schools and from partner institutes are also possible as electives for a double degree alongside the Centralien Programme.

Admission to one of the 6 Specialized Masters for Master-level specialization and continuing education in specific engineering and management fields is possible upon application assessment based on candidate profile. Prerequisite to apply for this specialized curriculum is to already hold a Master or an equivalent postgraduate degree in a different scientific field. MS lectures at École Centrale de Lille are taught in English and/or in French. MS workload is 75 ECTS credits.

In partnership with ENSI Poitiers and ISAE-ENSMA, Ecole Centrale de Lille is a part of the prestigious International Master's Program in Turbulence. At the end of this highly selective two-year program, students are awarded a master's degree in Fluid Dynamics and Turbulence.

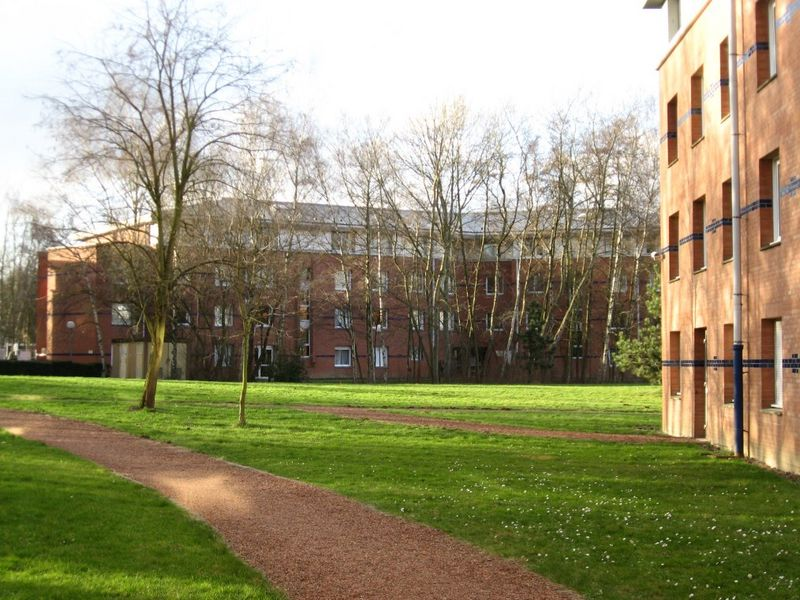
Centrale Lille - Rez

== Research ==
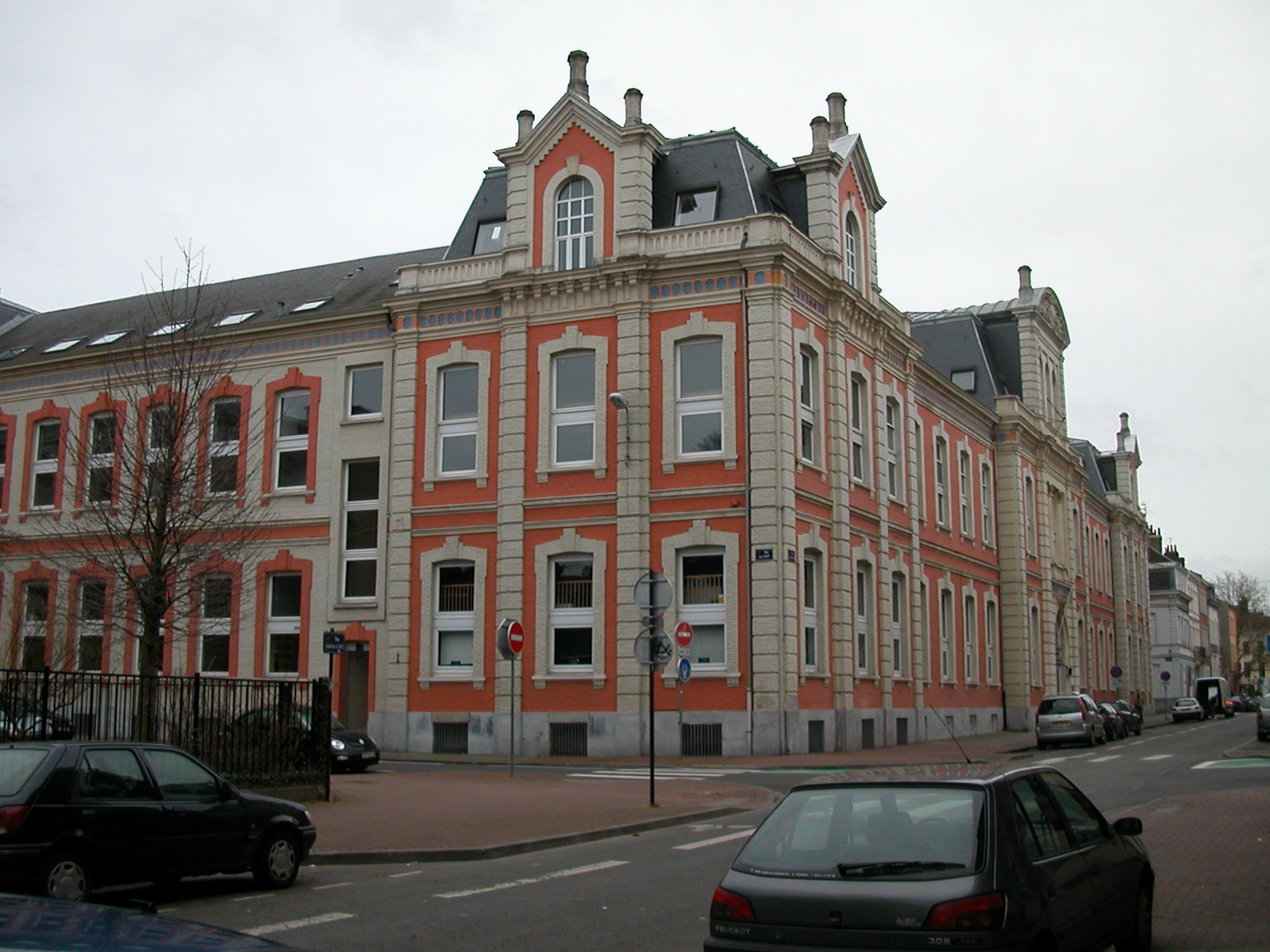
Historical building (1875-1968) - Institut industriel du Nord

École Centrale de Lille is a member of the European Doctoral College Lille Nord de France that provides 400 doctorate dissertations every year. École Centrale de Lille delivers the doctorate degree in seven engineering sciences specialities.

PhD doctorate candidates shall preferably hold a Master of Sciences/Research degree prior to entering doctoral cursus. Academic doctoral research studies and industry-sponsored doctoral research studies can be performed in École Centrale de Lille research labs.

PhD doctorate candidates and visiting researchers are welcome and should contact directly one of the 7 research labs associated to École Centrale de Lille.

- Automatic Control, Computer Science and Signal Processing : Laboratoire d'Automatique, Génie Informatique et Signal
- Mechanical engineering, fluid mechanics & civil engineering : Laboratoire de mécanique de Lille, Laboratoire de Mécanique, Multiphysique, Multiéchelle (LaMcube).
- Electrical Engineering and Power Electronics: Laboratoire d'électrotechnique et d'électronique de puissance de Lille
- Electronics, Microelectronics, Nano-technologies: Institut d'électronique de microélectronique et de nanotechnologie
- Chemical engineering, Catalysis and Solid Chemistry: Unité de catalyse et de chimie du solide de Lille
- Systems Engineering & Manufacturing : Laboratoire de génie industriel de Lille
- Materials Science & Processing : Research unit

== Alumni ==
Association des Centraliens de Lille (alumni association) supports École centrale de Lille and its graduates, organises conferences, events and funding campaigns for the Foundation Centrale-Initiative.

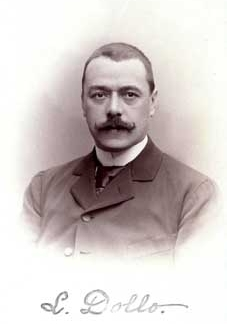
Louis Dollo (1877), paleontologist known for his work on Iguanodons and paleobiology (Dollo's law of irreversibility)

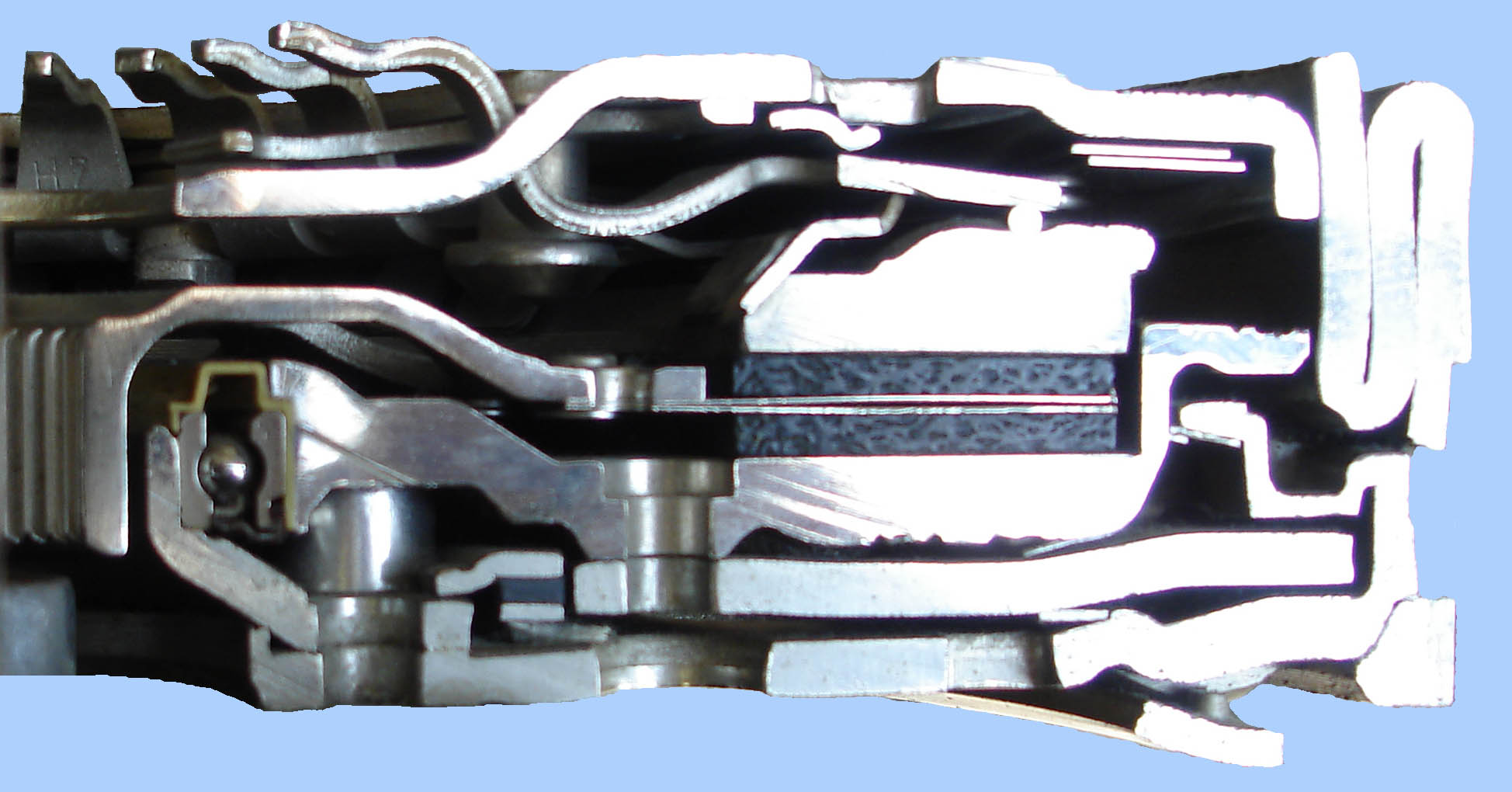
Jacques Vandier (1895), inventor of automobile brakes and clutches, owner of Valeo automotive supplier

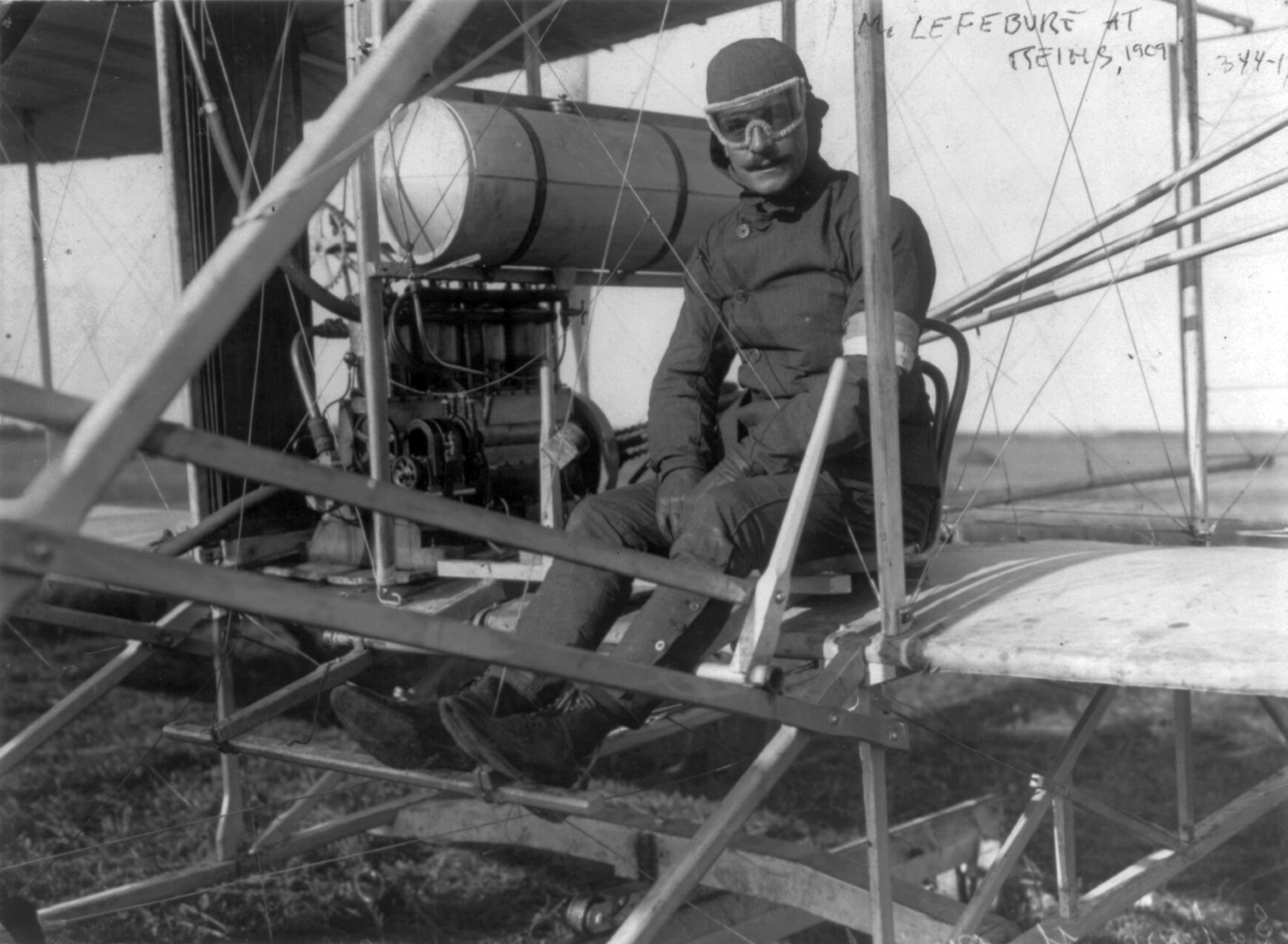
Eugène Lefebvre (1898), test pilot and world's first pilot to be killed in an accident while flying an engine aircraft

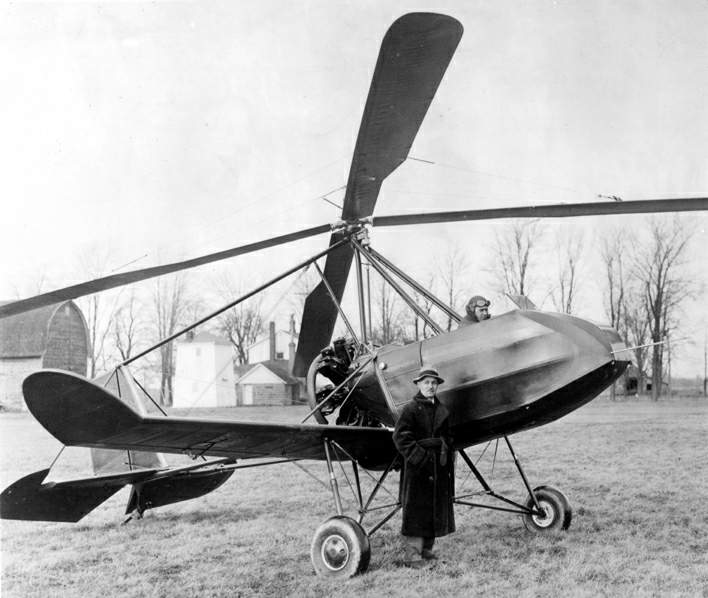
Etienne Dormoy (1906), known as the designer of the first certified aircraft (US type approval n°1 - 1927)

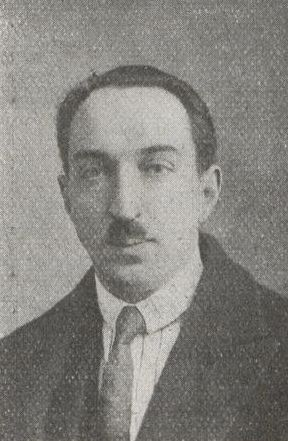
Jean Hubert (1906), aircraft chief engineer, world record aircraft crossing of the North Atlantic Ocean

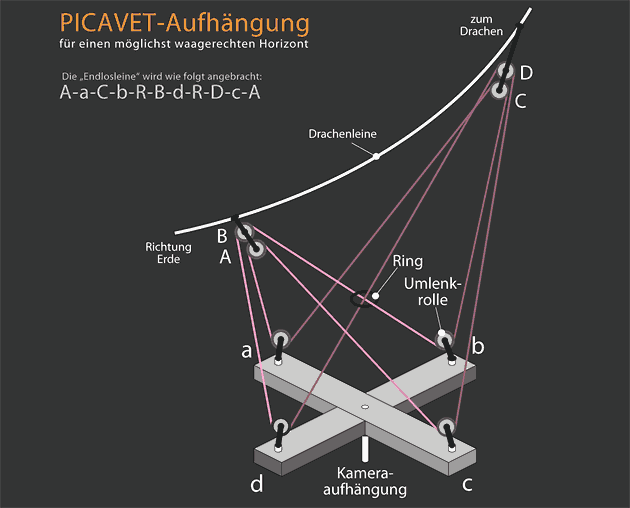
Pierre Picavet (1912), inventor of the Picavet suspension for aerial photography

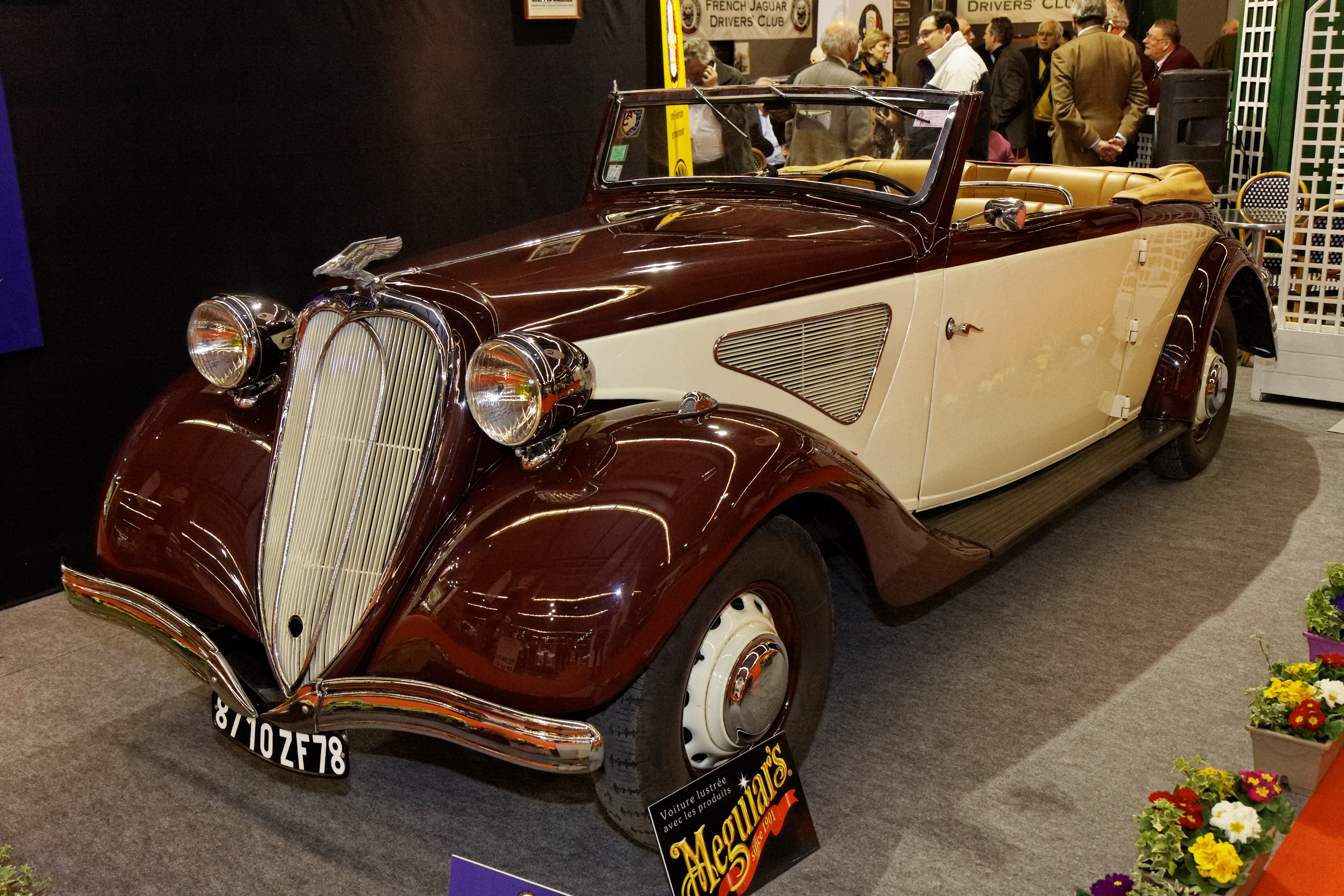
Lucien Chenard (1920), CEO of Chenard et Walcker car manufacturer

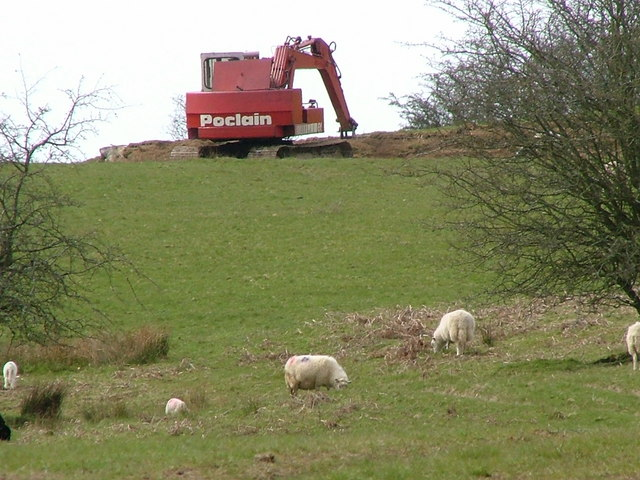
Pierre Bataille (1946) and Jacques Bataille (1944), inventors of Poclain hydraulic excavators

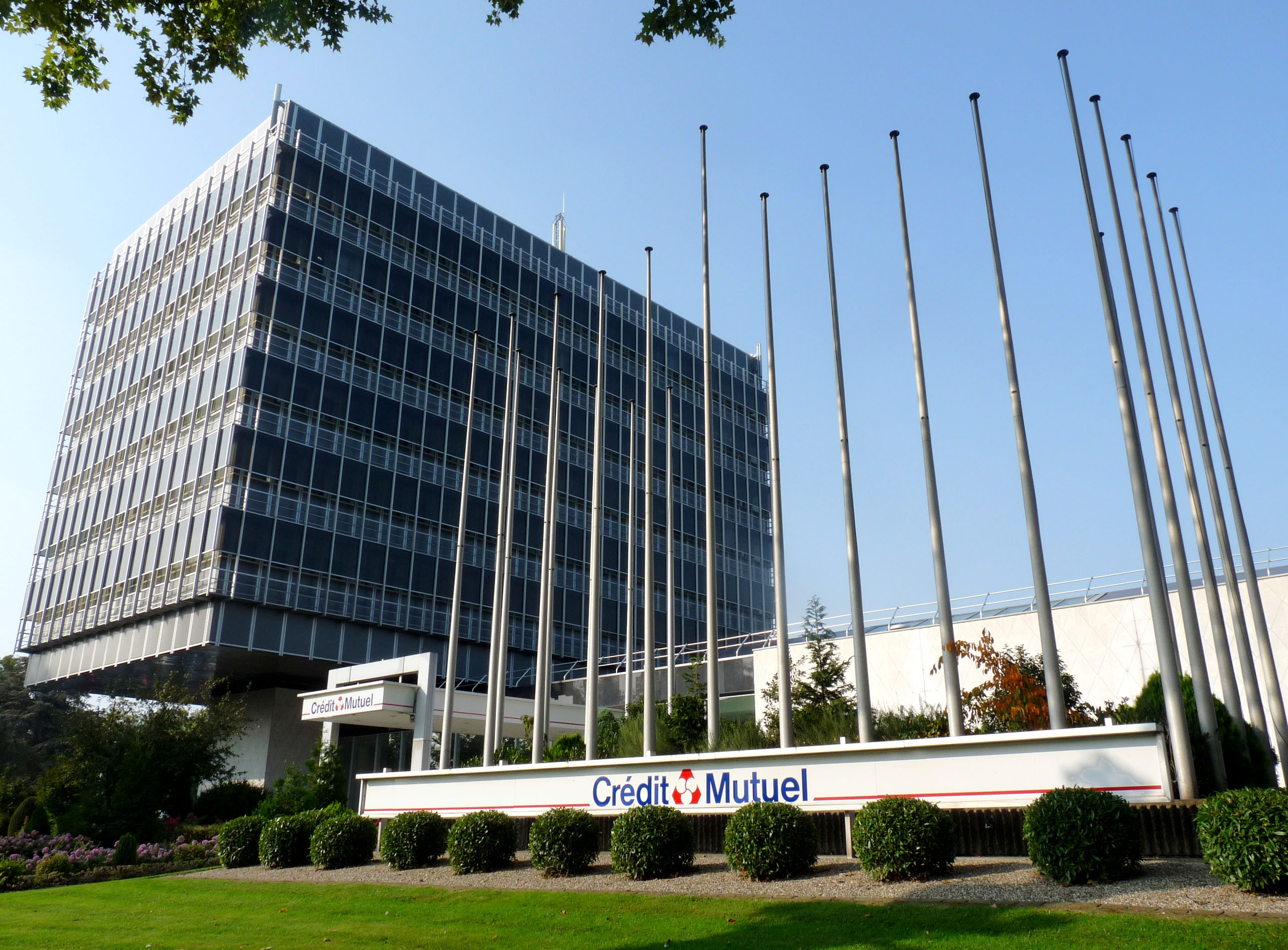
Bank information technologies pioneered and developed by Michel Lucas (1965), président of Crédit Mutuel

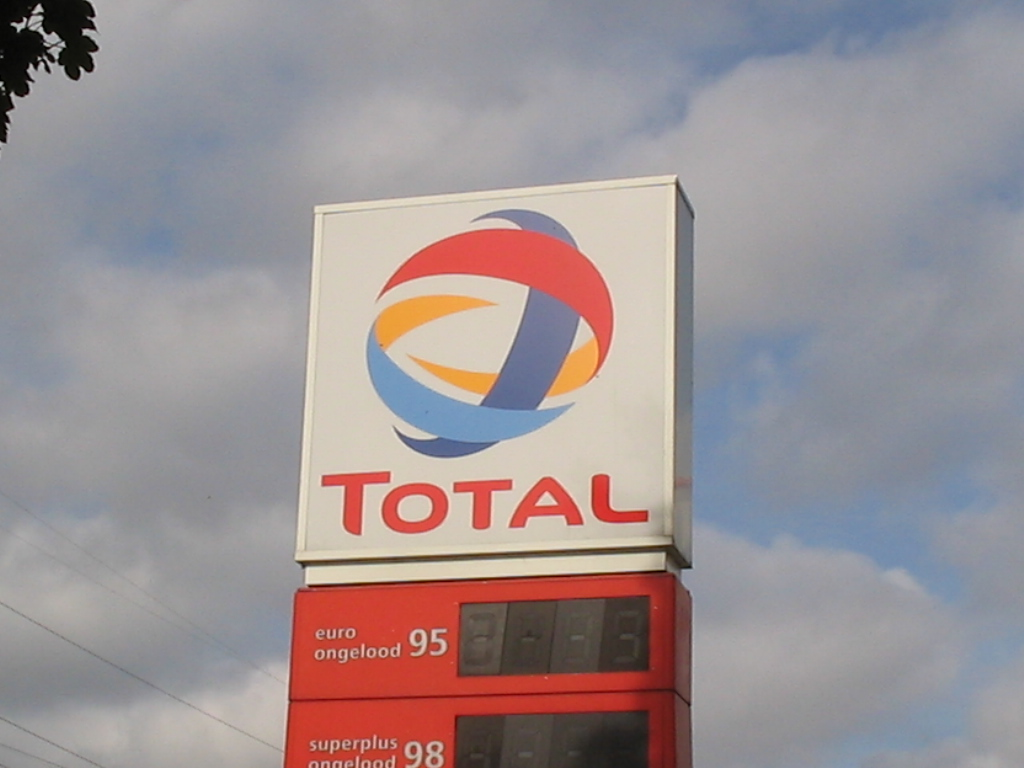
Robert Castaigne (1968), CFO and board member of TotalEnergies petroleum company

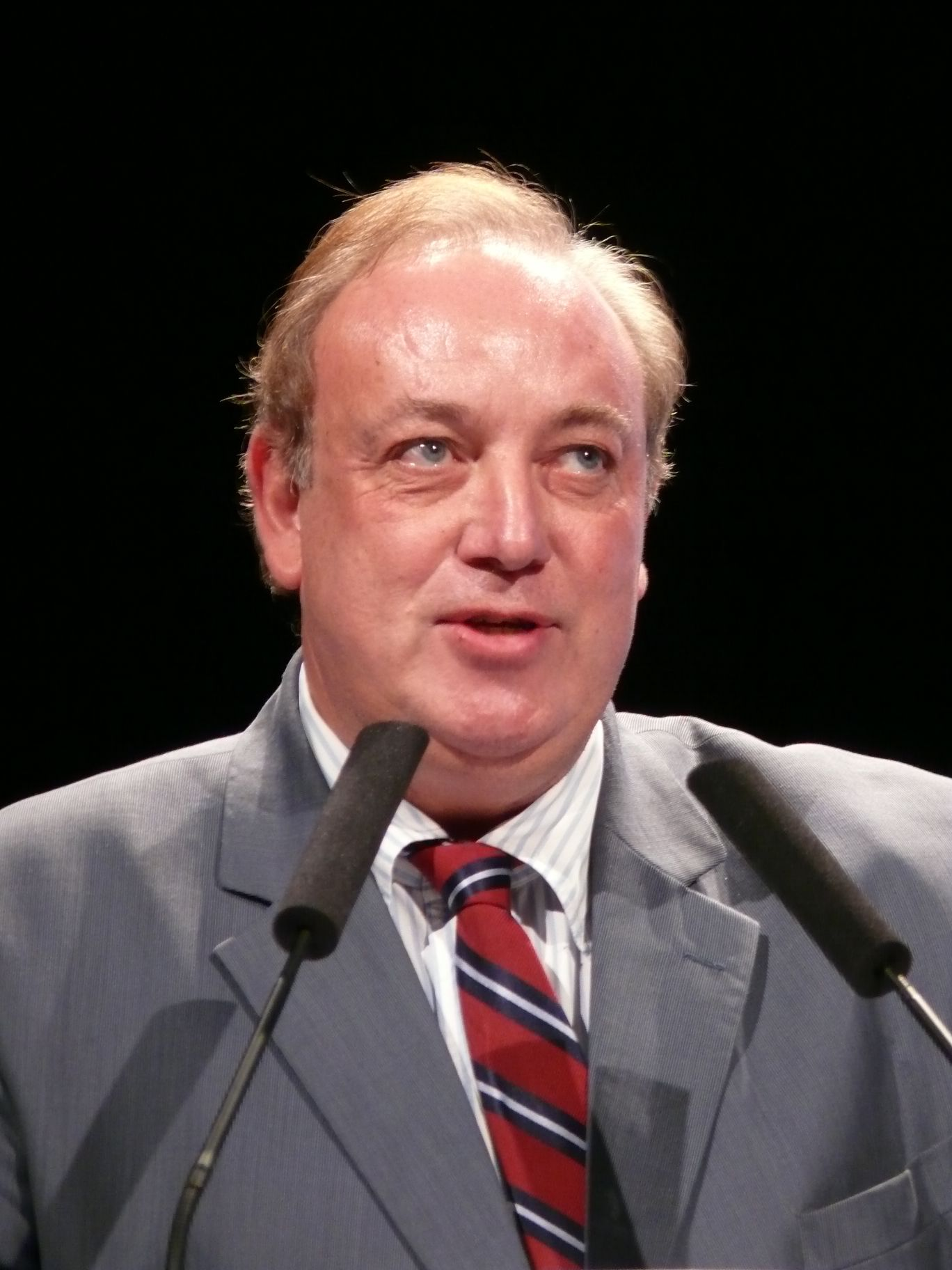
Marc-Philippe Daubresse (1976), French politician and government minister

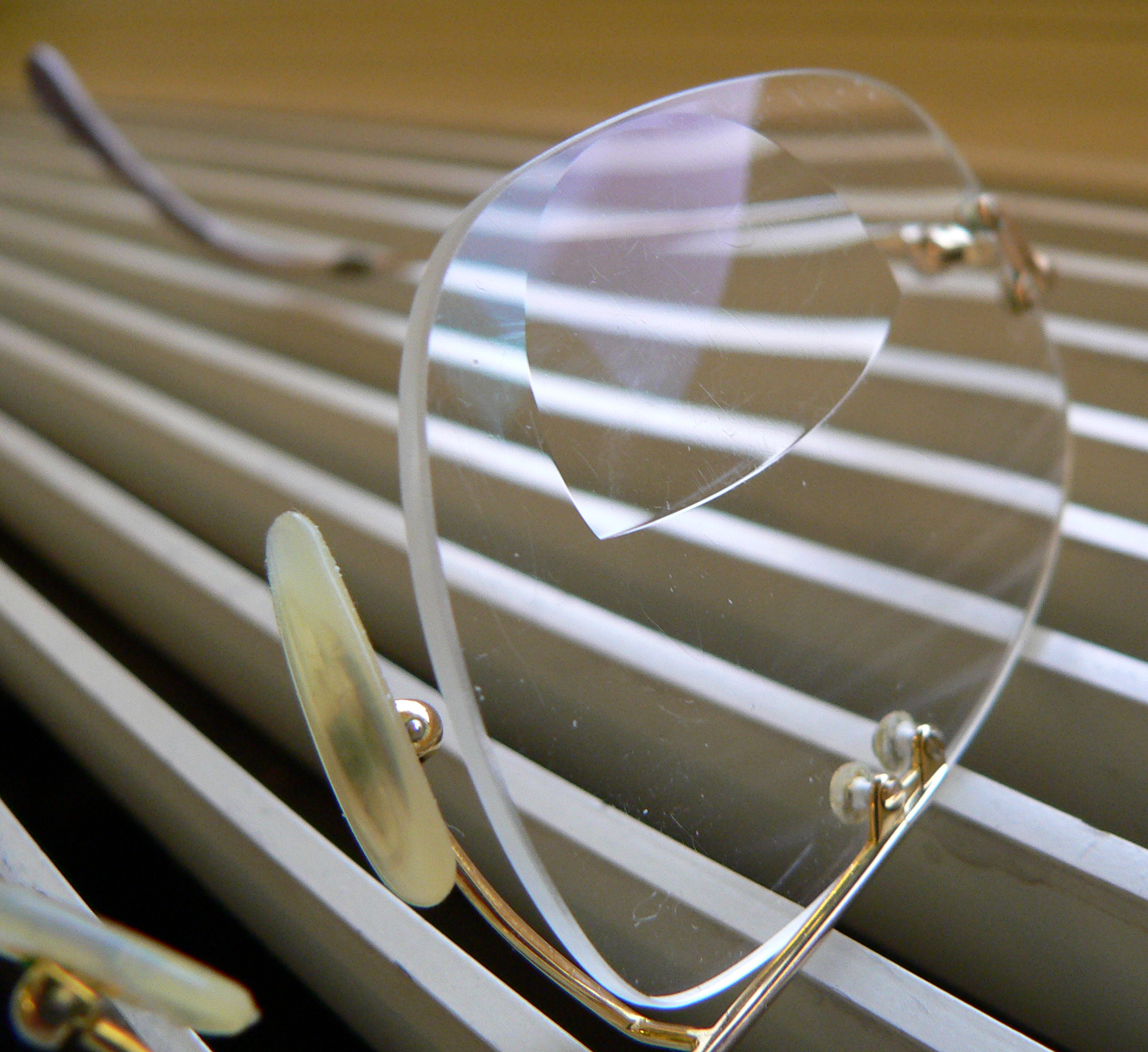
Hubert Sagnières (1980), CEO Essilor, manufacturer of ophthalmic optical equipment

== Notable faculty ==
- Claude Auguste Lamy, chemist, faculty member from 1854 to 1865, known for his discovery of the chemical element thallium in 1862
- Joseph Valentin Boussinesq, mathematician and physicist, faculty member from 1872 to 1886, known for Boussinesq approximation in continuum mechanics
- Victor Henry, linguist, faculty member from 1872 to 1883
- Alfred Mathieu Giard, bio-engineering physicist, faculty member from 1872 to 1882
- Bernard Brunhes, physicist, taught electrical engineering until 1885, known for his discovery of geomagnetic reversal
- Gaston du Bousquet, taught steam locomotive engineering until 1894
- Camille Matignon, thermo-chemist, faculty member from 1894 to 1898
- Henri Padé, mathematician, faculty member from 1897 to 1902, known for Padé table and Padé approximant
- Albert Châtelet, scientist known for Châtelet algebraic variety, faculty member from 1913 to 1921, and politician, candidate for French presidential election, 1958
- Joseph Kampé de Fériet, taught fluid dynamics and information theory from 1930 to 1969.

== École Centrale de Lille as a hub for engineering science ==
- International role for engineering pedagogy, academic programmes and double degrees, including :
  - Centrale Graduate School with Centralien programme and third-year student mobility;
  - Top Industrial Managers for Europe (TIME) double degrees network implemented in Europe and worldwide.
- Focal role in Lille Eurodistrict for a pole of excellence with engineering programmes and double degrees with the following specialized institutes located in the neighbourhood of École Centrale de Lille:
  - University of Lille for joint Masters curricula and research labs in engineering science;
  - École nationale supérieure de chimie de Lille with joint chemical engineering research laboratory, associated to a Masters'degree in Catalysis and Processes, to a Mastère (MS) Spécialisé in Drug design and to a Mastère (MS) Spécialisé in Intellectual Property;
  - ESC Lille Graduate School of Management joint programme in Entrepreneurship ;
  - ESA - École Supérieure des Affaires de Lille in a Banking & Finance advanced programme;
  - Faculté polytechnique de Mons for MSc in architectural engineering.
- Focal role in Europe for doctoral studies and research labs in engineering domains organised as
  - European Doctoral College Lille Nord de France and its Doctoral school of engineering science
  - Centrale Lille research labs grouping researchers in Lille and hosting laboratories shared with other institutes
  - Member of CARNOT ARTS research institute
  - Joint research activities with
    - CARNOT C3S,
    - CARNOT IEMN (Institut d’Électronique, de Microélectronique et de Nanotechnologie) research institute,
    - CARNOT INRETS - IFSTTAR (French institute of science and technology for transport, development and networks),
    - CARNOT ONERA (fluid mechanics) Institut de mécanique des fluides de Lille
  - Joint researches in computer science with Laboratoire d'Informatique Fondamentale de Lille and with INRIA Lille Nord Europe
  - Joint researches in intelligent transportation systems through GRRT research cluster.
