= Institut industriel du Nord =

Coordinates: 50°36′23″N 3°08′13″E

Institut industriel du Nord (IDN)
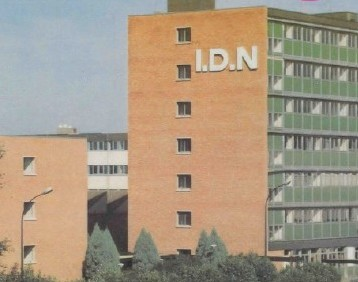
- Type: Engineering school and research institute
- Established: 1872 (Engineering school foundation 1854)
- Affiliations: École centrale de Lille
- Location: Lille, France

The Institut industriel du Nord (IDN) was the engineering school and research institute at École Centrale de Lille from 1872 to 1991, within the campus of the Lille University of Science and Technology (France).

== History ==
École des arts industriels et des mines (École Centrale de Lille) was a college of engineering founded in Lille in 1854 during the Second French Empire. On the eve of the French Third Republic, lectures and research activities were reorganised into a comprehensive three-year curriculum and developed in 1872, embodied by its newly built Institut industriel du Nord de la France (IDN). Education initially focused on civil engineering, mechanical engineering, chemistry and manufacturing engineering.

Lille's Institut Industriel du Nord was the only French institution approximating to a German Technische Hochschule.

— John M. Roberts, A General History of Europe; Europe 1880-1945, First published 1967 by Pearson Education limited; Third edition published 2013 by Routledge, Taylor & Francis Group; ISBN 0582357454; ISBN 978-0-582-35745-7

Electrical engineering full courses were added in 1892, automobile design has been taught from 1899 onwards. More than 200 students graduated in year 1914. Aerodynamics studies started in 1930. A focus on automatic control and computers was initiated in 1957. Later came courses and research in computer science, supply chain management, materials science, micro-electronics and telecommunications.

Since early 20th century, student admission has been based on a competitive exam after attending a classe préparatoire aux grandes écoles or similar undergraduate studies.

The Institut industriel du Nord was originally located in Lille central district until 1875. Larger buildings with dedicated laboratories were inaugurated in 1875 nearby the Faculté des sciences de Lille. It then moved in 1968 in the modern campus of Lille University of Science and Technology, in the south-east suburb of Lilly.

== See also ==
- École Centrale de Lille
