= Charles Frédéric Kuhlmann =

French chemist (1803–1881)

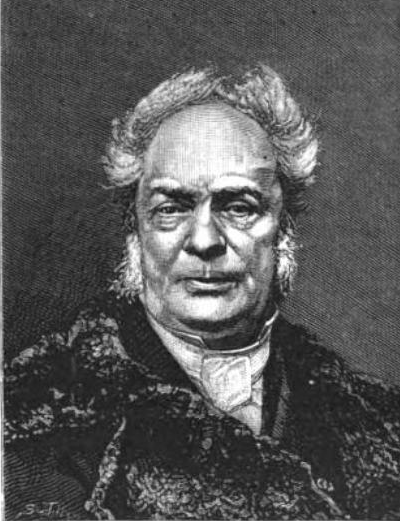
- Born: 22 May 1803; Colmar, France
- Died: 27 January 1881 (aged 77); Lille, France
- Scientific career
- Fields: Chemist
- Workplaces: Université Lille Nord de France

Charles Frédéric Kuhlmann (22 May 1803 – 27 January 1881) was a French chemist who patented the reaction for converting ammonia to nitric acid, which was later used in the Ostwald process.

He was both a research scientist and a professor at Université Lille Nord de France. He promoted chemical engineering education for science graduates in Lille and supported the development of École centrale de Lille (IDN).

As an entrepreneur starting in 1829, he established his own chemical company producing sulfuric acid. This company later merged into Pechiney Ugine Kuhlmann group.

== Bibliography ==
- Bibliothèque numérique de Lille-Frédéric Kuhlmann
- Aftalion, Fred; Benfey, Otto Theodor (1991). A history of the international chemical industry. University of Pennsylvania Press. p. 87. ISBN 9780812282078.
- Obituary of Kuhlmann in La Nature 26 Feb 1881, scanned at google books
