= Laboratoire d'Automatique, Génie Informatique et Signal =

Research laboratory in Lille, France

Coordinates: 50°36′22″N 3°08′10″E

The Laboratoire d'Automatique, Génie Informatique et Signal (LAGIS) is a French research laboratory (UMR CNRS 8146) located on the Science campus of the University of Lille. It is hosted in the premises of École centrale de Lille. Since January 2015, the LAGIS has merged with another laboratory, the Laboratoire d'Informatique Fondamentale de Lille (LIFL). The resulting laboratory is now CRIStAL.

== Research history ==
LAGIS roots date back to year 1957 when the University of Lille started a research laboratory on command and control. Simultaneously, a curriculum was established for students from Lille faculty of sciences and a curriculum elective item on servomechanism for engineer students from École centrale de Lille. These curricula items were later transformed into a control science curriculum.

Historically, research area in Lille were focused on control systems and computer engineering for large scale systems, and the laboratory was named LAIL (Laboratoire d'automatique et d'informatique industrielle) at that time. This was due to funding for applied research such as optimal command for ironworks processes, job-shop scheduling and control for manufacturing systems in automobile industry and automated logistic centres, control systems for terrestrial transport systems (especially for rail transportation systems and automated metro such as VAL). Mechatronics applications have been considered later as expanding control and computer engineering applications wherein the know-how developed in LAGIS laboratory is useful.

== Research area ==
Today, LAGIS academic and applied research roadmap include the following area:

- Bond graph
- Decision engineering
- Continuous and discreet event Dynamical system; Petri net
- Non linear systems
- System Safety engineering
- Vision and image processing

== See also ==
- Laboratoire d'Informatique Fondamentale de Lille
- IFSTTAR Lille-Villeneuve d'Ascq - Institut national de recherche sur les transports et leur sécurité
- VAL metro research area
