= École centrale de Pékin =

École Centrale de Pekin
- Type: Engineering school
- Established: 2005; 21 years ago
- Affiliations: Centrale Graduate School, BUAA
- Location: Beijing, China
- Website: http://ecpkn.buaa.edu.cn/

École centrale de Pékin
- Simplified Chinese: 北航中法工程师学院
- Traditional Chinese: 北航中法工程師學院
Transcriptions
Standard Mandarin
- Hanyu Pinyin: Běiháng Zhōngfǎ Gōngchéngshī Xuéyuàn

École Centrale de Pékin (abbreviated ECPk, simplified Chinese: 北航中法工程师学院; traditional Chinese: 北航中法工程師學院) is a Sino-French engineering school in the centre of Beijing, China. It was established in 2005 by the initiative of the Écoles Centrales Network, a group of France's leading graduate schools in engineering research and education including the prestigious École Centrale Paris, together with China's Beihang University - the nation's top research institution in the field of aeronautics and astronautics.

ECPk campus is located at Beihang University.

== History ==
In 2004, an agreement was signed by the Écoles Centrales and Beihang University to create the École Centrale de Pékin, which was then founded in 2005 in Beijing. In line with the Centrale education model which promotes close ties with the industry, the school signed partnerships with several major corporations in France and China, such as Société Générale, Alstom, Airbus, Schlumberger, Orange S.A., Safran, PSA Peugeot Citroën, COMAC, Total, and Ernst & Young, which have committed to support the institution's development as founding partners. Their contributions are to include defining the school's education strategy as well as providing financial support, research cooperation, industrial training, and publicity.

École Centrale Beijing was inaugurated in September 2005 by Hervé Biausser, director of Ecole Centrale Paris (now CentraleSupélec) and representative of the Écoles Centrales. The first class of students graduated in January 2012.

== Admission ==
It recruits 100 students each year among the best of the Chinese education system, after the nation's intensive university entrance examinations (Gaokao, 高考).

== Training ==
Most lessons are conducted in French, and the training lasts 6 years, after which graduates receive a master's degree from the Beijing University of Aeronautics and Astronautics (Beihang University) and the French diplôme d'ingénieur. The first three years correspond to preparatory classes similar to the French classes préparatoires and are based on 4 domains: language, mathematics, physical sciences, and industrial engineering.

The last three years correspond to the "generalist" engineer curriculum followed by the Écoles Centrales. Some of the specialization options include Materials Science, Computer Science, Electrical Engineering, Mechanical Engineering, Physics, Aeronautical Engineering, and Aerospace Science.

International exchange programs are also being planned as part of the curriculum.
