= I-Trans cluster =

I-Trans cluster is a French cluster for railway industry, sustainable multimodal and urban transportation systems. It is located in Northern France at Villeneuve-d'Ascq and Valenciennes and is supported by Université Lille Nord de France, Réseau Ferré de France, SNCF, Alstom.

== Overview ==
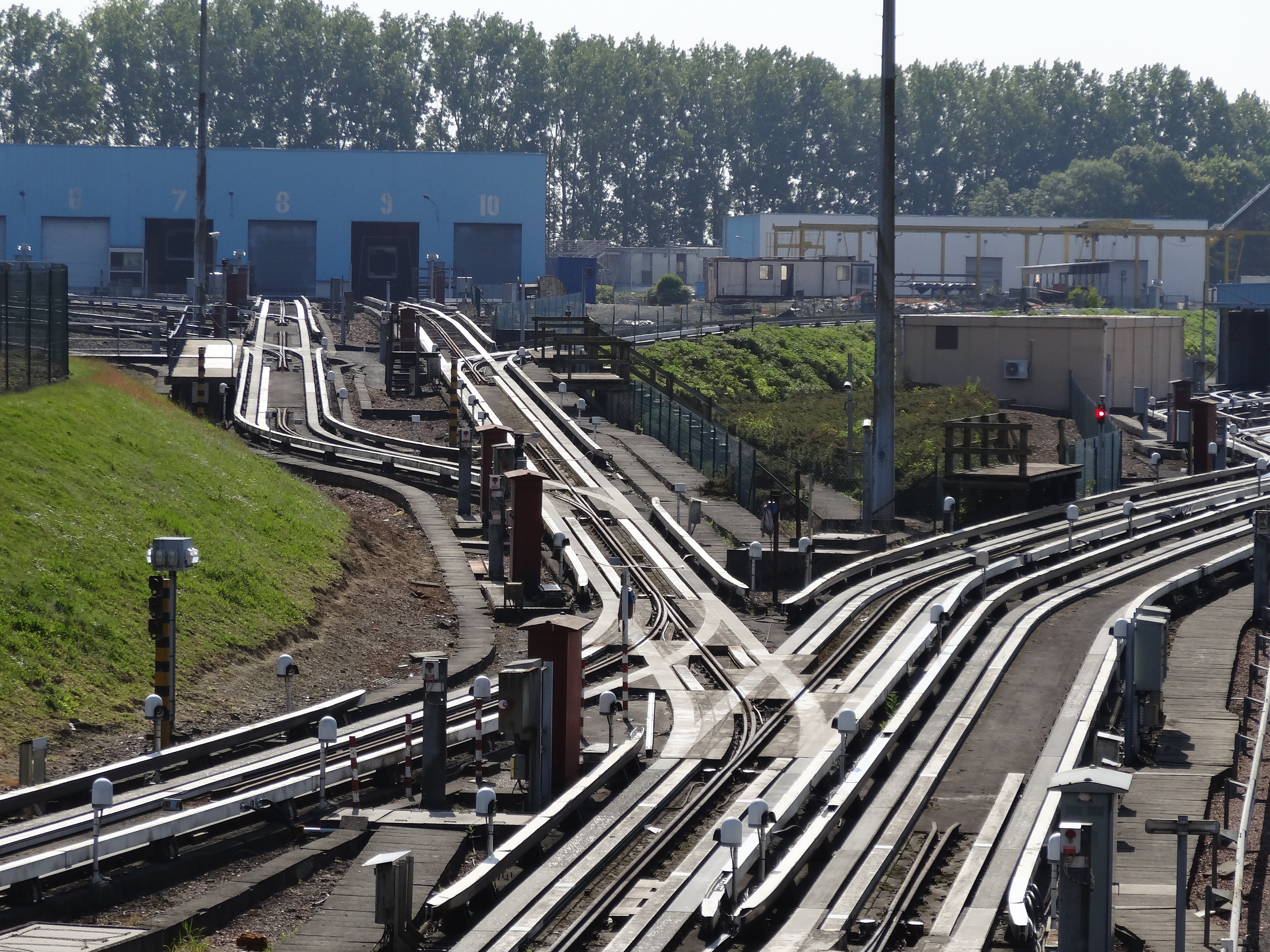
Intelligent Metro railways

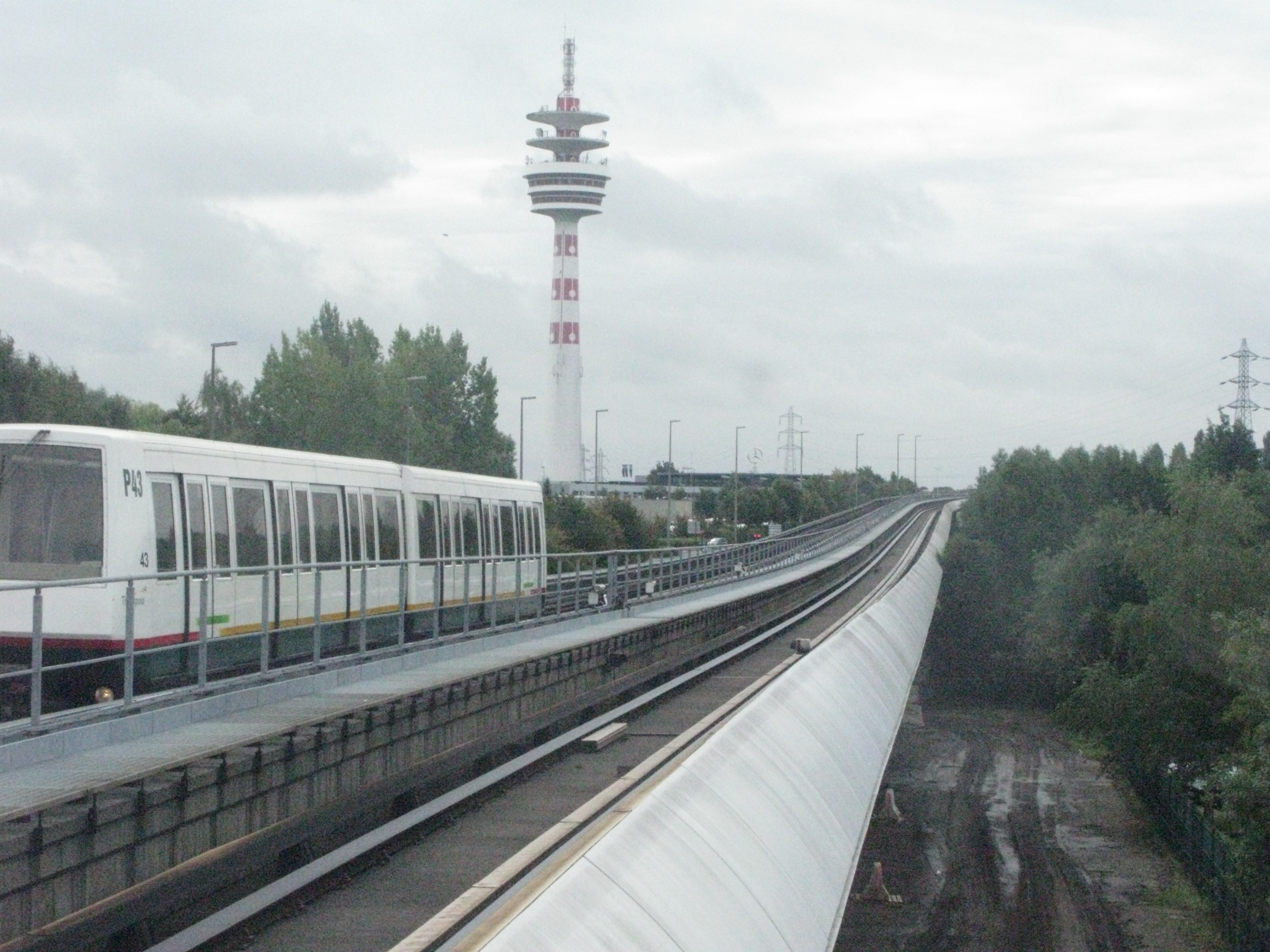
VAL people mover metro

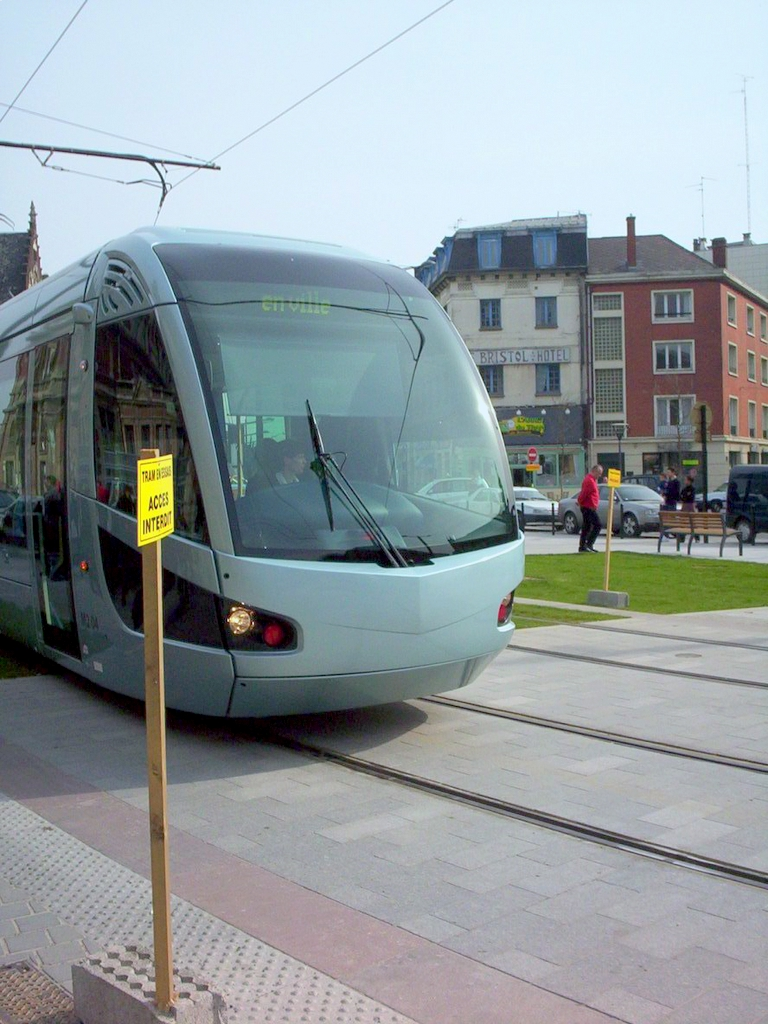
Alstom Citadis Tramway at Valenciennes

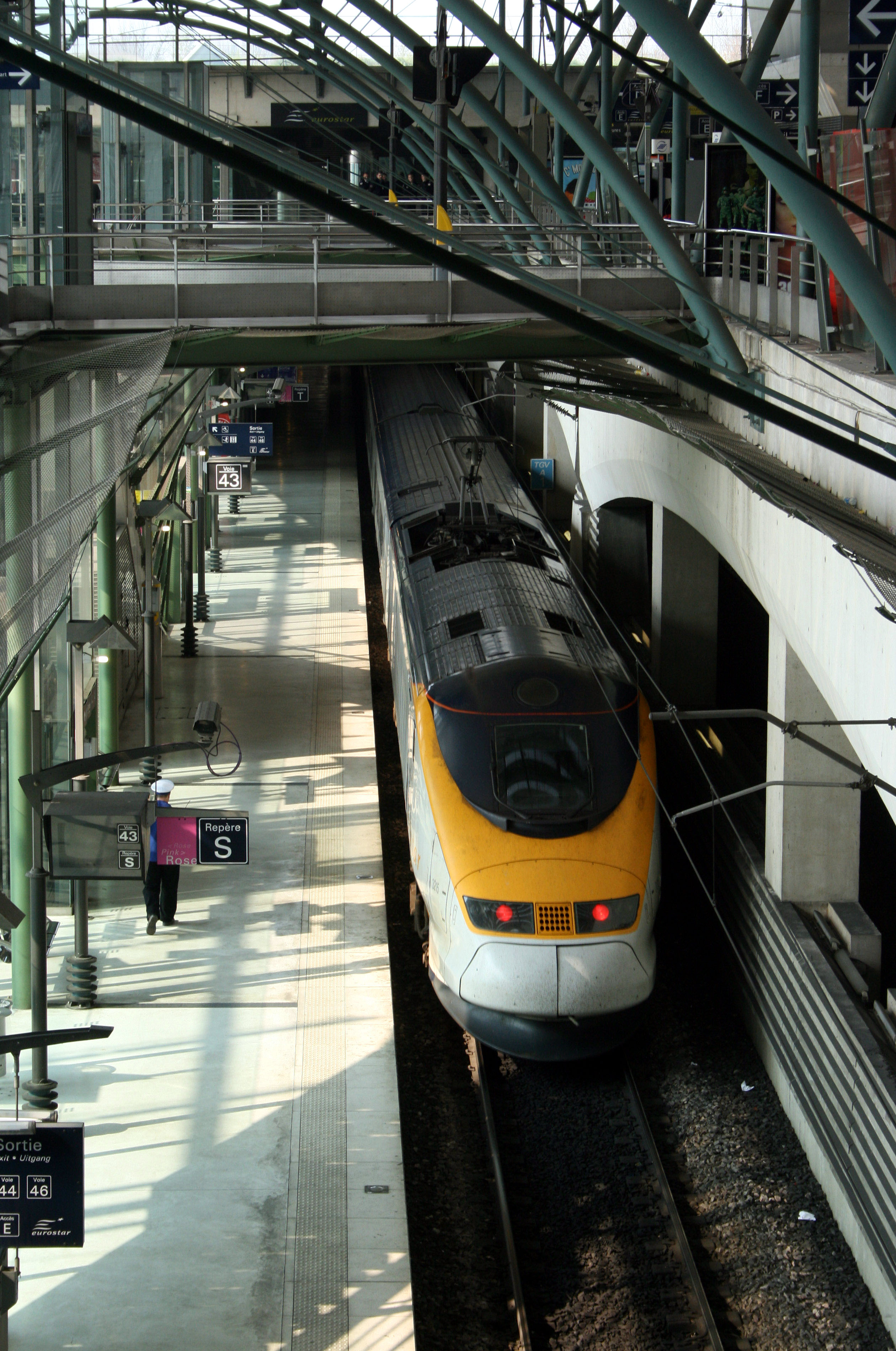
Eurostar at Lille station

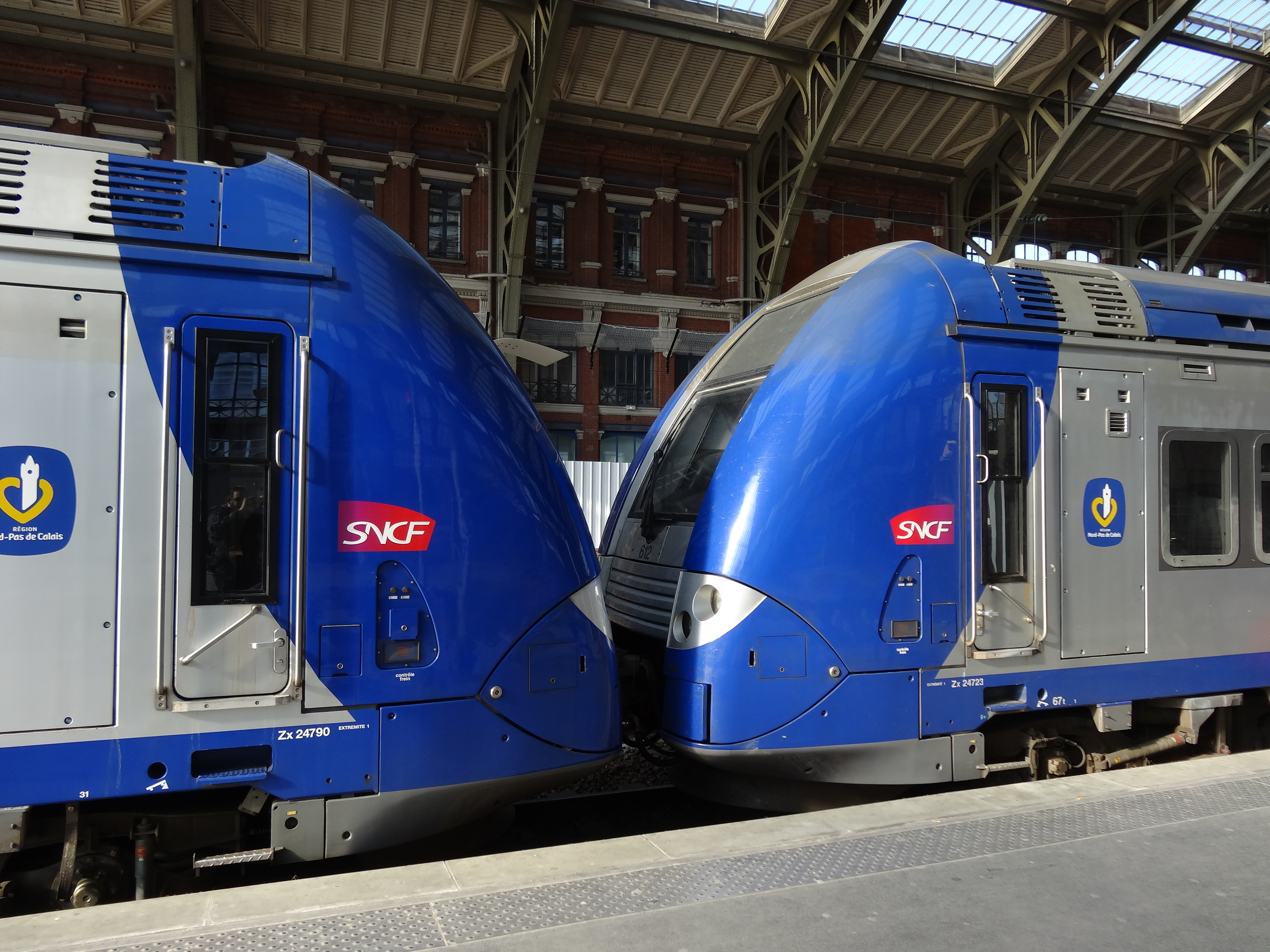
Regional trains

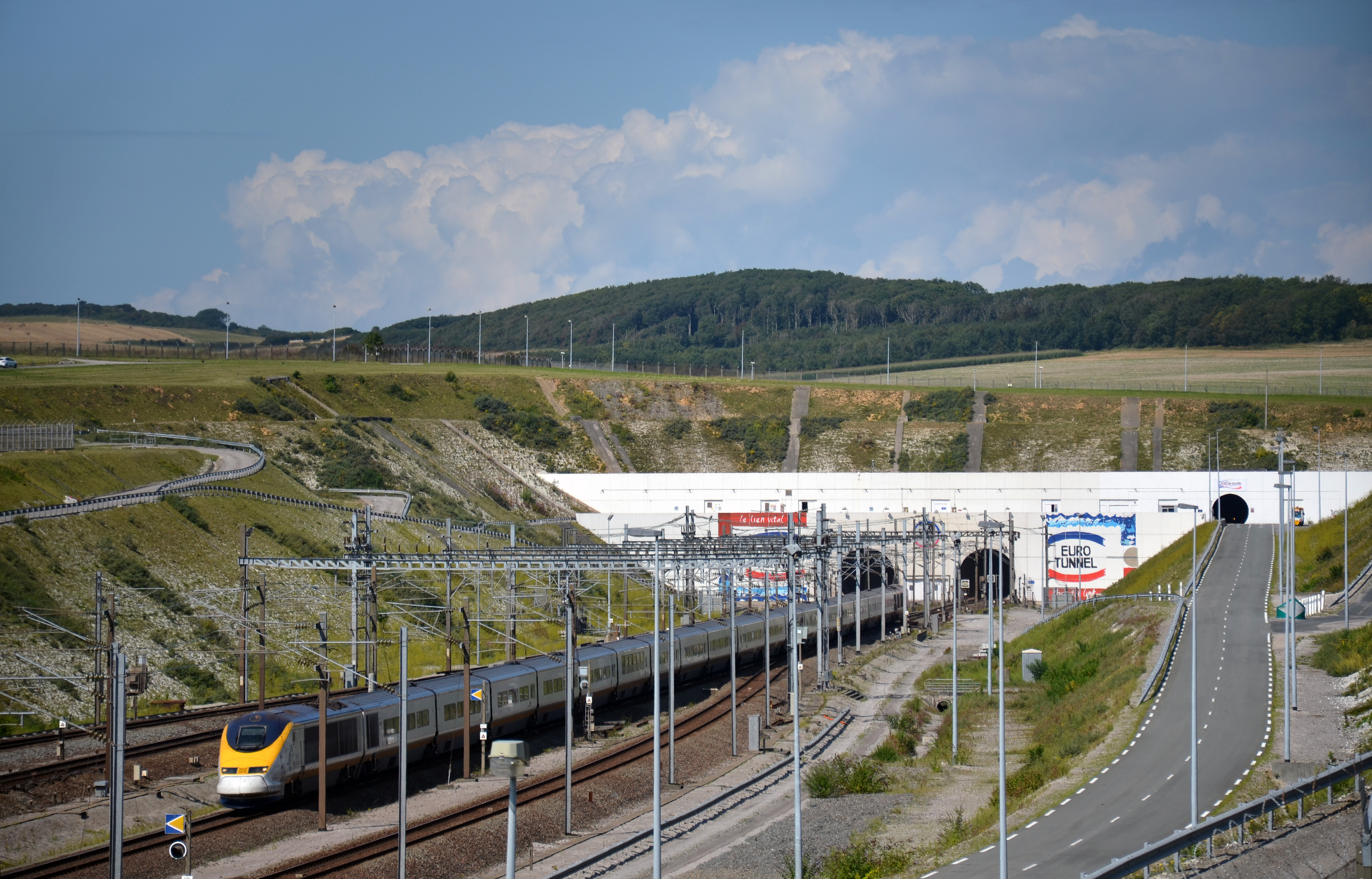
Channel railways tunnel

European Train Control System

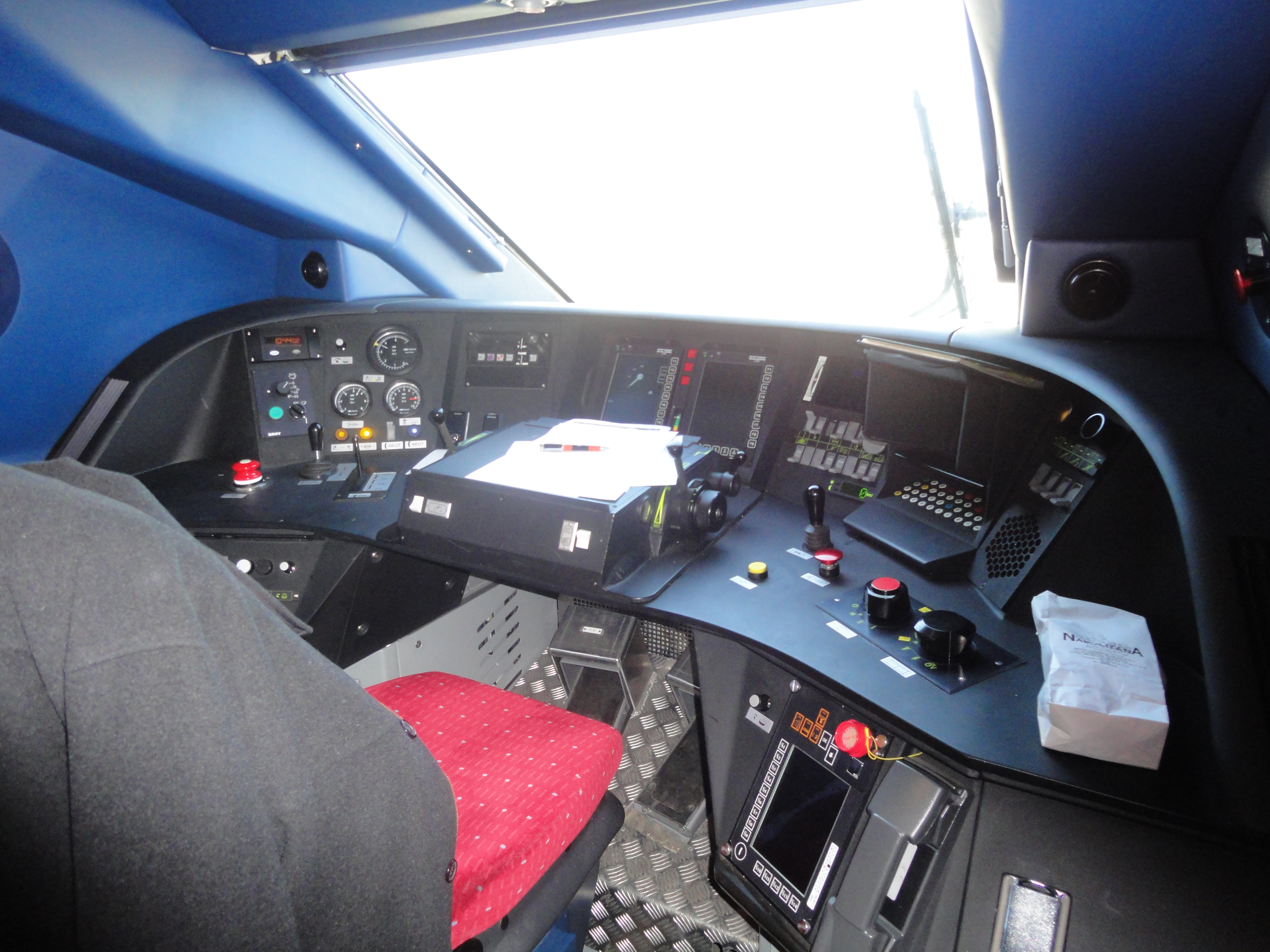
TGV cockpit

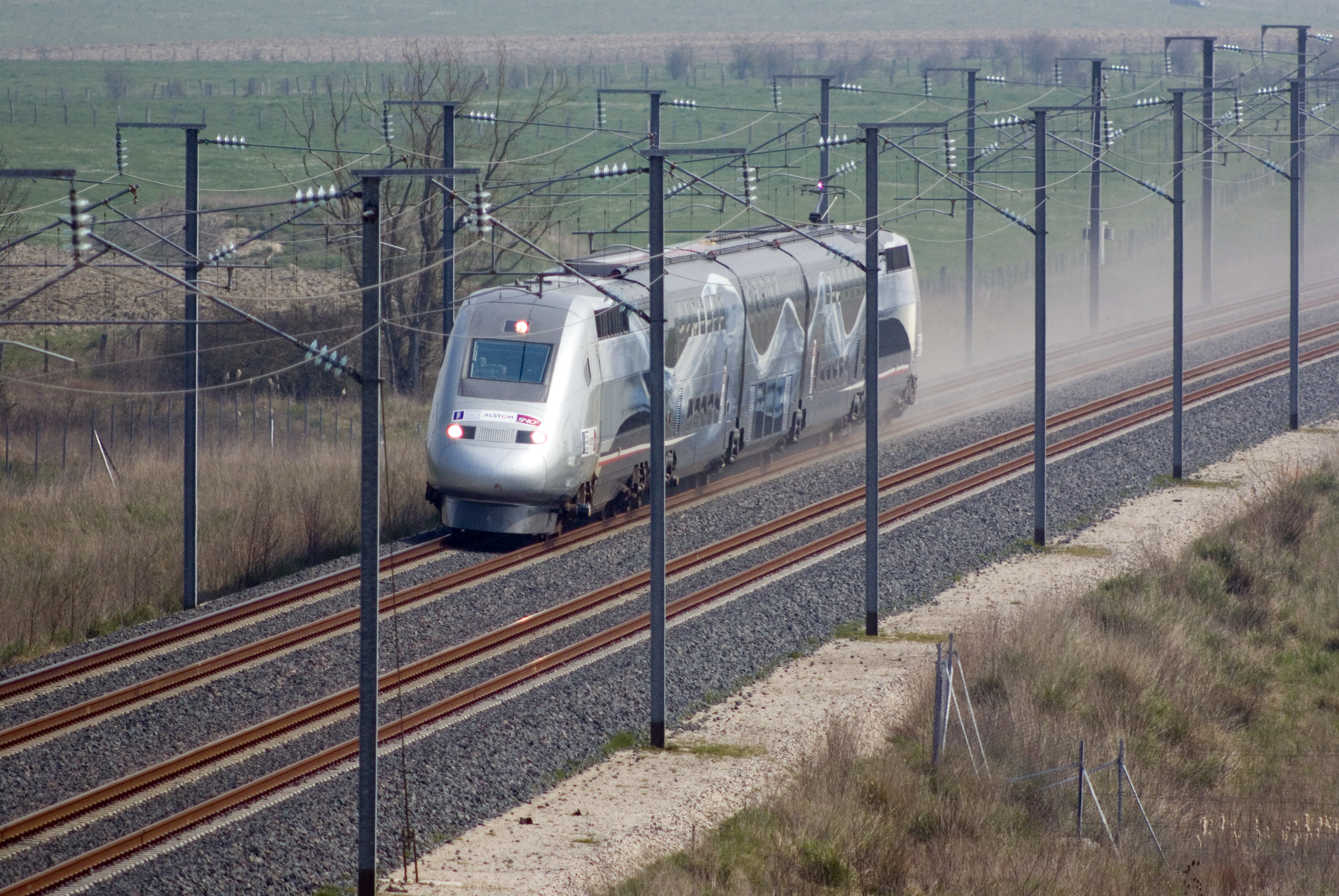
TGV World Speed Record 574 km/h

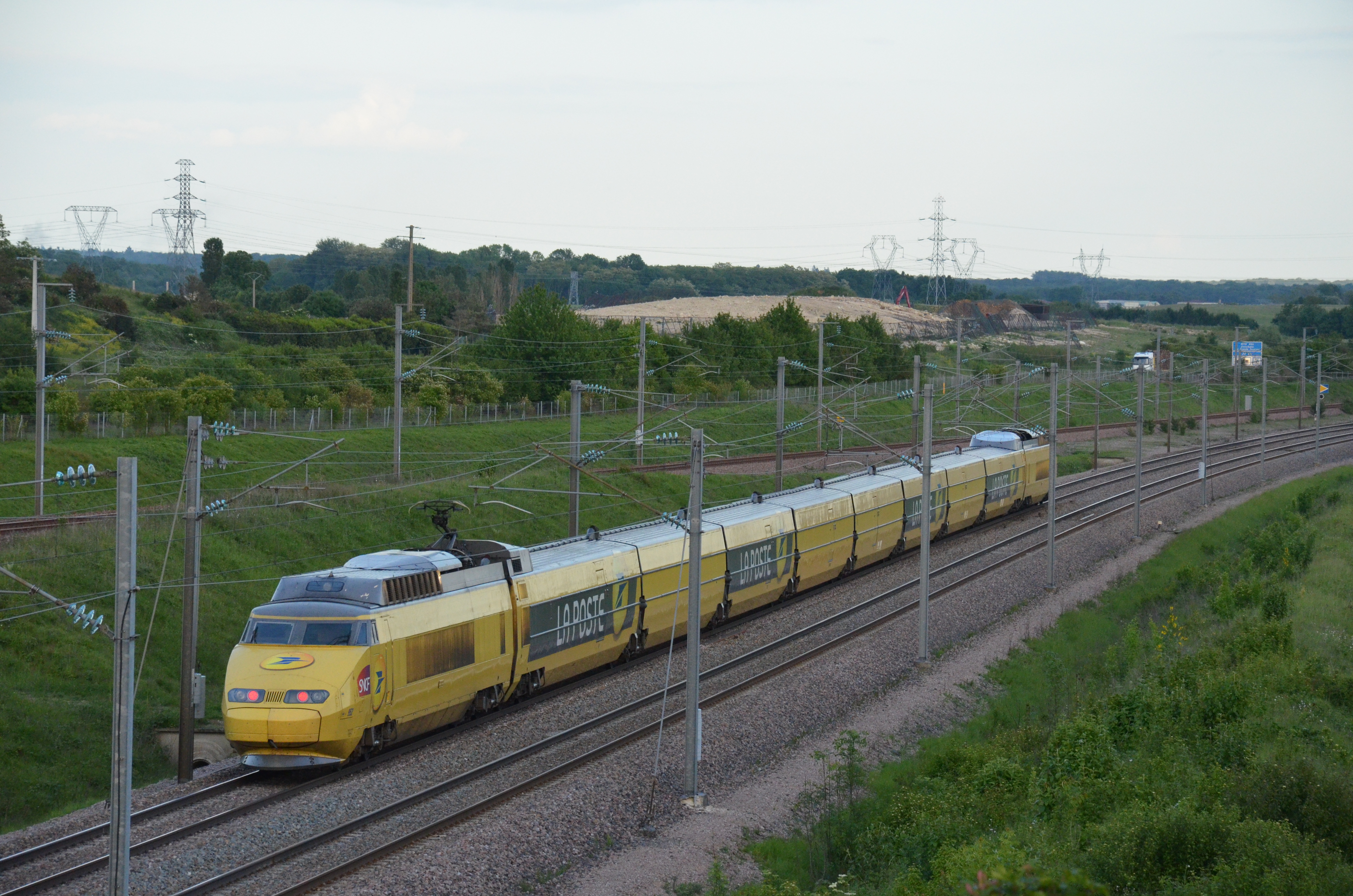
Postal TGV

== Ralenium institute ==
I-Trans cluster is the founding member of Ralenium institute.
