= Top International Managers in Engineering =

European network of engineering schools and faculties

- Abbreviation: T.I.M.E.
- Formation: 1988; 38 years ago
- Founder: Ecole Centrale Paris
- Founded at: Paris, France
- Location: Europe
- Secretary General: Gwenaelle Guillerme
- Website: timeassociation.org

Top International Managers in Engineering (T.I.M.E.), formerly Top Industrial Managers for Europe, is a network of fifty-seven engineering schools, faculties and technical universities. The oldest European network of engineering schools in its field, the T.I.M.E. Association promotes graduate student exchanges and double degrees throughout Europe and the world to enable students to achieve a broader, high-level scientific engineering education with in-depth intercultural experience.

Several hundreds of graduate students per year participate in T.I.M.E. mobility activities and pursue double degrees (at Master and Doctorate levels). Double degrees require the participating student to spend more than three semesters in another member university and at least the same in his/her home university, to be awarded two full degrees.

The T.I.M.E. network includes primarily graduate engineering schools and technical universities from Europe, but increasing numbers of members are now from other continents.

== History ==
In 1989, the T.I.M.E. network was created at the École Centrale Paris. Its main purpose was to coordinate European double degree and exchange programs in engineering at the Master's level. The T.I.M.E. network had 16 founding members, each a leading engineering institution in its respective country. The T.I.M.E. Association was formally incorporated as a not-for-profit body under French law in 1997, with 29 members. Current membership is 57 institutions from 23 countries.

== Member institutions ==
TIME members include the following engineering schools and faculties and technical universities:

Australia:

- The University of Queensland (AU-UQ)

Austria:

- Technische Universität Wien (AT-TUW)

Belgium:

- UCLouvain (BE-UCL)
- Université libre de Bruxelles (BE-ULB)
- University of Liège (BE-ULG)
- University of Mons (BE-FPMS)
- Vrije Universiteit Brussel (BE-VUB)

Brazil:

- Universidade de São Paulo Escola Politécnica (BR-USP)
- Universidade Estadual de Campinas (BR-UNICAMP)

China:

- Xi'an Jiaotong University (CN-XJTU)
- Beihang University (CN-BUAA)

Czech Republic:

- České vysoké učení technické v Praze (CZ-CVUT)

Denmark:

- Danmarks Tekniske Universitet (DK-DTU)

Spain:

- Universidad Politécnica de Madrid (ES-UPM)
- Universitat Politècnica de València (ES-UPV)
- Comillas Pontifical University - ICAI (ES-UPCo)
- University of Seville - ETSI (ES-USE)
- Universitat Politècnica de Catalunya (ES-UPC)

France:

- CentraleSupélec (FR-CS)
- École Centrale de Lille (FR-ECLi)
- École Centrale de Lyon (FR-ECLy)
- École Centrale de Marseille (FR-ECM)
- École Centrale de Nantes (FR-ECN)
- Ecole Nationale des Ponts et Chaussées (FR-ENPC)
- École Nationale Supérieure de Techniques Avancées (FR-ENSTA)
- École Nationale Supérieure de l'Aéronautique et de l'Espace (FR-Supaero)

Germany:

- RWTH Aachen University (DE-RWTH)
- Technische Universität Berlin (DE-TUB)
- Technische Universität Darmstadt (DE-TUDa)
- Dresden University of Technology (DE-TUDr)
- Leibniz University Hannover (DE-LUH)
- Technical University of Munich (DE-TUM)

Greece:

- Aristotle University of Thessaloniki (GR-AUTH)
- Athens Polytechnic (GR-NTUA)

Hungary:

- Budapest University of Technology and Economics (HU-BME)

Italy:

- Politecnico di Milano (IT-PoliMi)
- Politecnico di Torino (IT-PoliTo)
- Università degli Studi di Padova (IT-UniPd)
- Università degli Studi di Trento (IT-UniTn)

Japan:

- Doshisha University (JP-DOSHISHA)
- Keio University (JP-KEIO)
- Tohoku University (JP-TOHOKU)

Norway:

- Norges Teknisk-Naturvitenskapelige Universitet (NO-NTNU)

Poland:

- Wroclaw University of Technology (PL-PWR)
- AGH University of Science and Technology (PL-AGH)

Portugal:

- Instituto Superior Técnico - University of Lisbon (PT-IST)

Russia:

- Bauman Moscow State Technical University (RU-BMSTU)
- Moscow Technological University (MIREA) (RU-MIREA)
- Tomsk Polytechnic University (RU-TPU)
- Saint Petersburg Polytechnical University (RU-SPBPU)

Sweden:

- KTH Royal Institute of Technology (SE-KTH)
- Lunds Tekniska Högskola (SE-LTH)

Turkey:

- Istanbul Technical University (TR-ITU)

== See also ==
- National Institutes of Technology – 31 leading public engineering universities in India
