= Laboratoire d'Informatique Fondamentale de Lille =

Research laboratory at Lille University (France)

Coordinates: 50°36′35″N 3°08′14″E

The Laboratoire d'Informatique Fondamentale de Lille (LIFL), is a computer science research laboratory of University of Lille, in Lille, France. LIFL was founded in 1983 and currently employs more than 200 employees. Since January 2015, the LIFL has merged with another laboratory, the Laboratoire d'Automatique, Génie Informatique et Signal (LAGIS). The resulting laboratory is now CRIStAL.

Most of the projects and teams at LIFL are supported and funded by the French National Centre for Scientific Research (CNRS) and the French National Institute for Research in Computer Science and Control (INRIA).
