= Universities of Lille =

The original public university in the Lille region of France was the University of Douai established in 1559 in Douai and that was moved to Lille in 1887 and 1896 as University of Lille (French: Université de Lille).

Between 1970 and 2017 the University of Lille was divided into three universities (student enrollment: 70,000):

- Lille 1 University of Science and Technology
- Lille 2 University of Health and Law
- Charles de Gaulle University – Lille III

In 2018, the new University of Lille was created with a merger of Lille 1, Lille 2 and Lille 3 universities.

Universities in the Academy of Lille (Académie de Lille) are members of the Community of Universities and Institutions (COMUE) Lille Nord de France and the European Doctoral College Lille Nord de France.

Three other small public universities are located in the neighbourhood of Lille city:

- Artois University
- University of the Littoral Opal Coast
- University of Valenciennes and Hainaut-Cambresis

Lille has also one private university (enrollment: 20,500) : the Université Catholique de Lille.

== See also ==
- Higher education in Lille
