= Lille University of Science and Technology =

Campus Lille 1, university located in Villeneuve d'Ascq, Lille, France

Coordinates: 50°36′33.38″N 3°08′29.72″E

University Lille 1: Sciences and Technologies
- French: Université Lille 1 : Sciences et Technologies
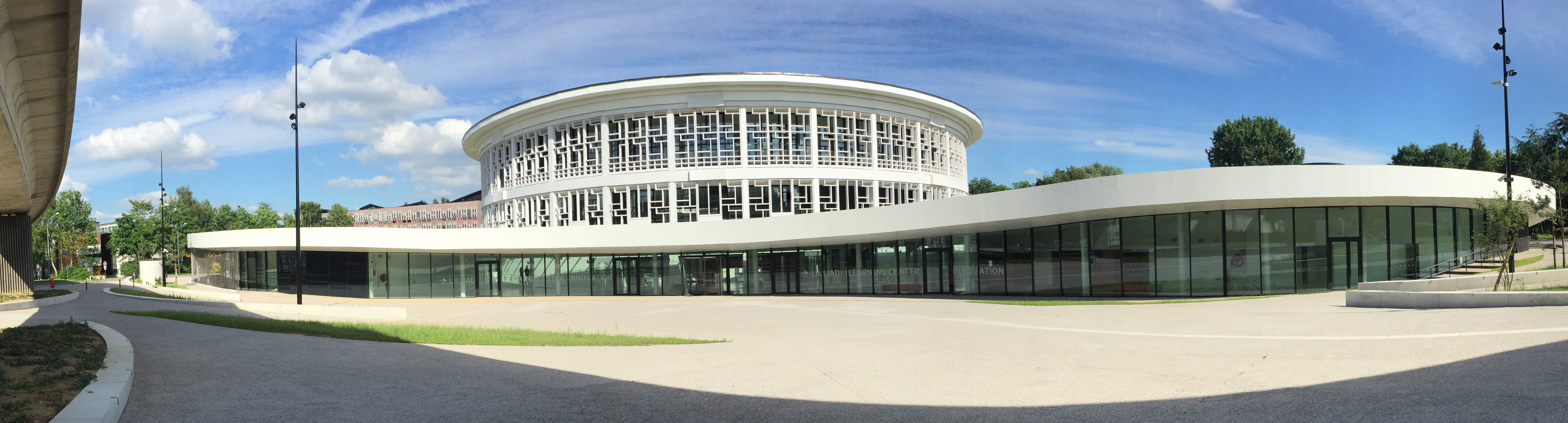
- Université de Lille I
- Type: Public: science and technology
- Established: 1559, 1854, 1970
- Affiliations: Community of Universities and Institutions (COMUE) Lille Nord de France
- President: Jean-Christophe Camart
- Administrative staff: 2,975
- Students: 20,292 (and 12,000 students in continuing education)
- Undergraduates: 11,000
- Postgraduates: 9,000
- Location: Villeneuve d'Ascq / Lille - European Metropolis of Lille, Hauts-de-France
- Campus: Cité Scientifique, Suburban, 1.1 km^{2}
- Research labs: 43
- Website: http://www.univ-lille1.fr/

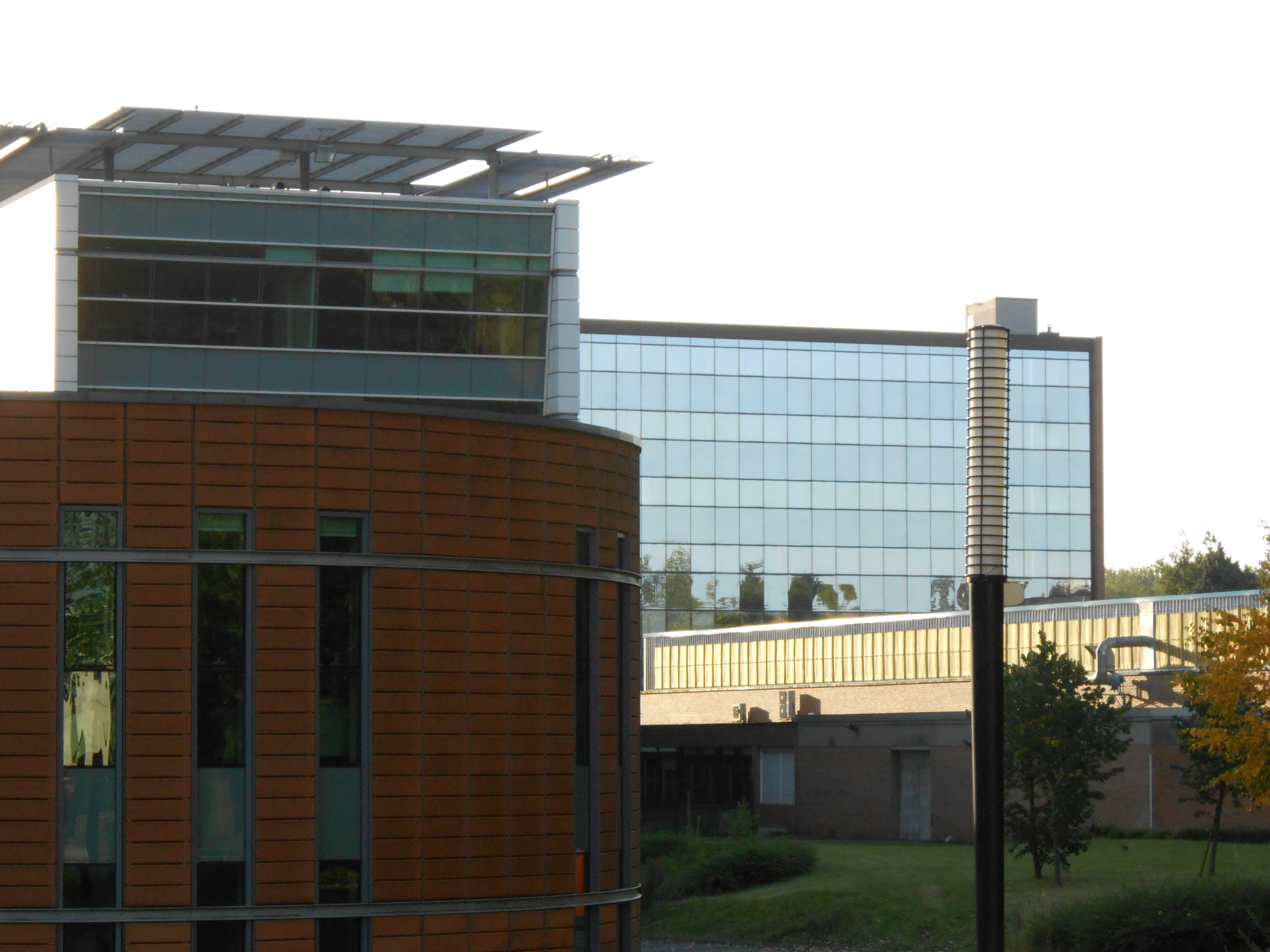
Campus Lille I

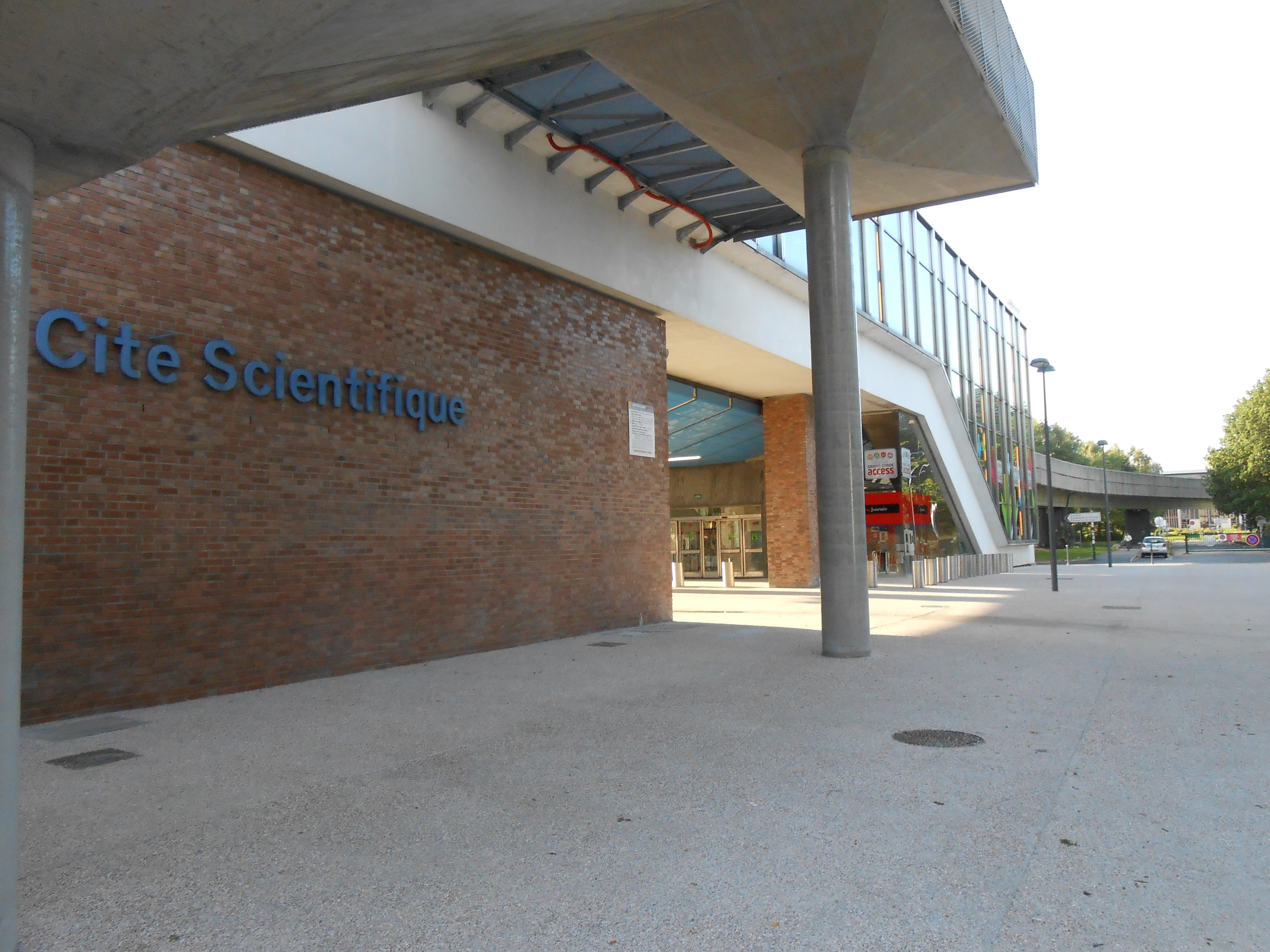
Cité scientifique (métro)

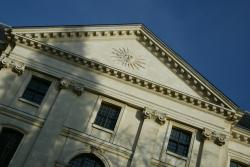
Institut d'administration des entreprises de Lille (IAE)

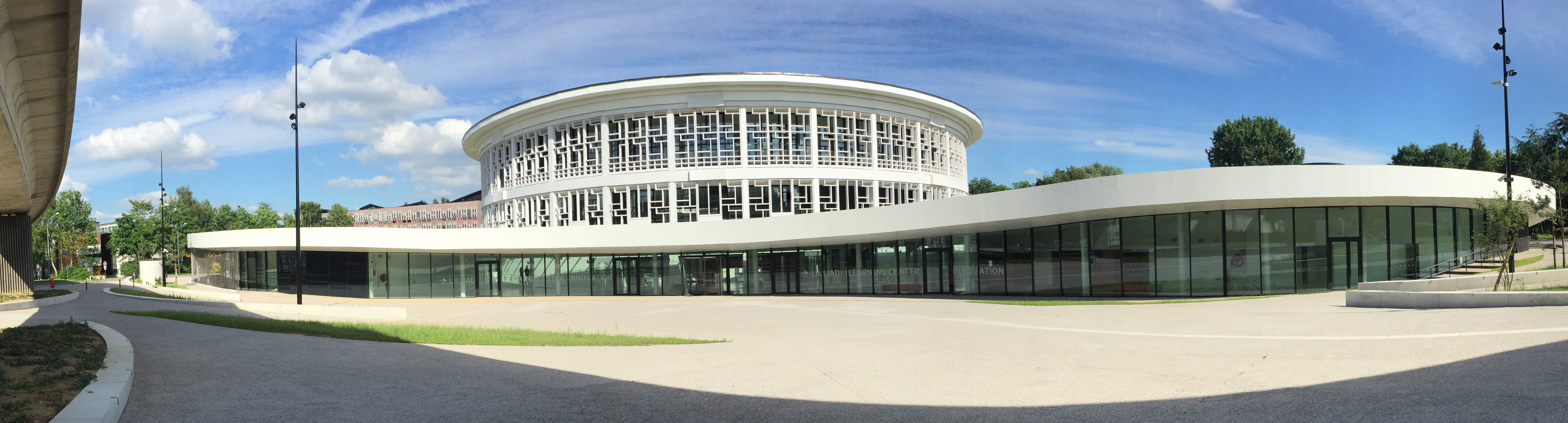
University library

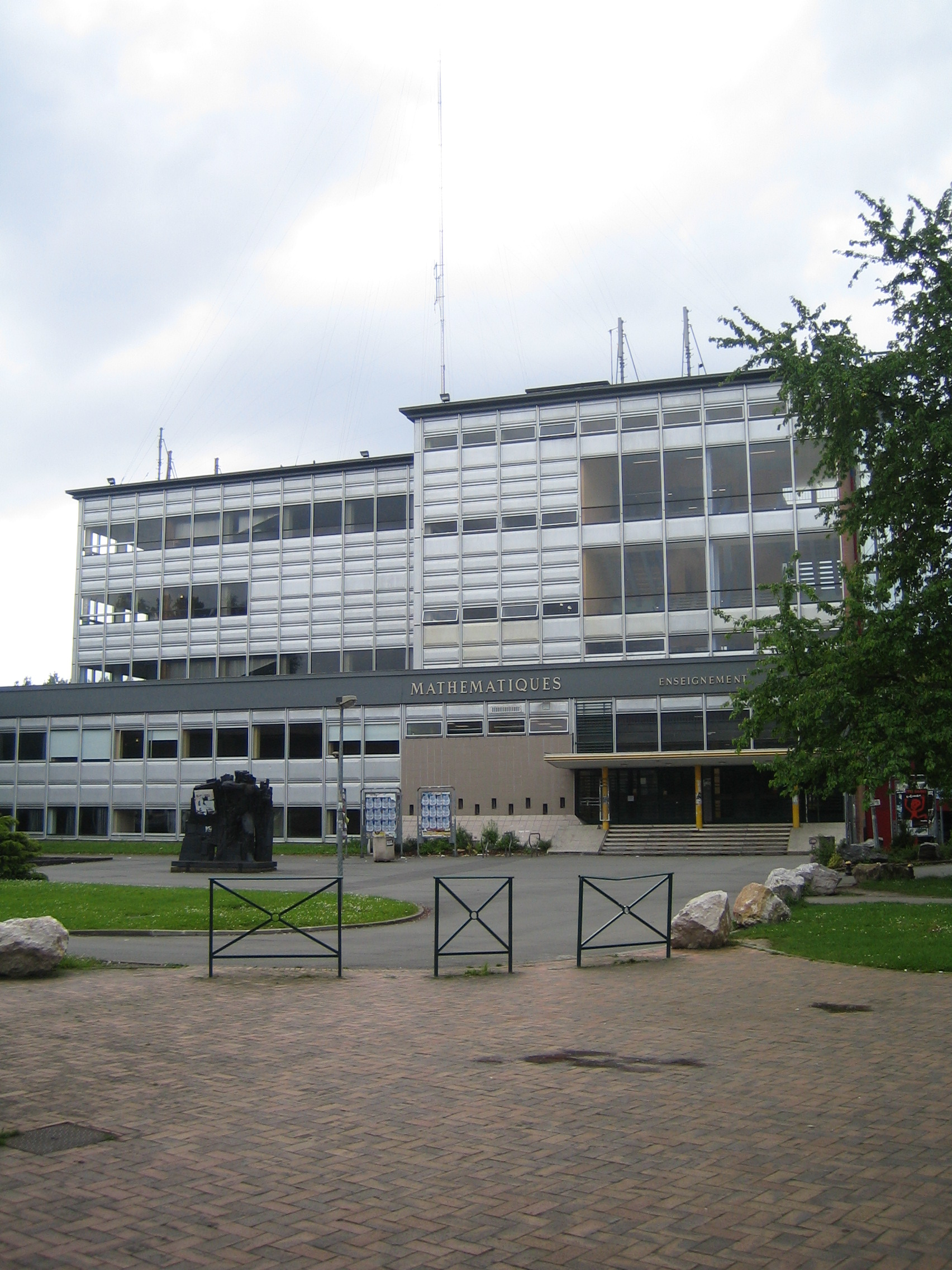
Building M1 - Mathematics

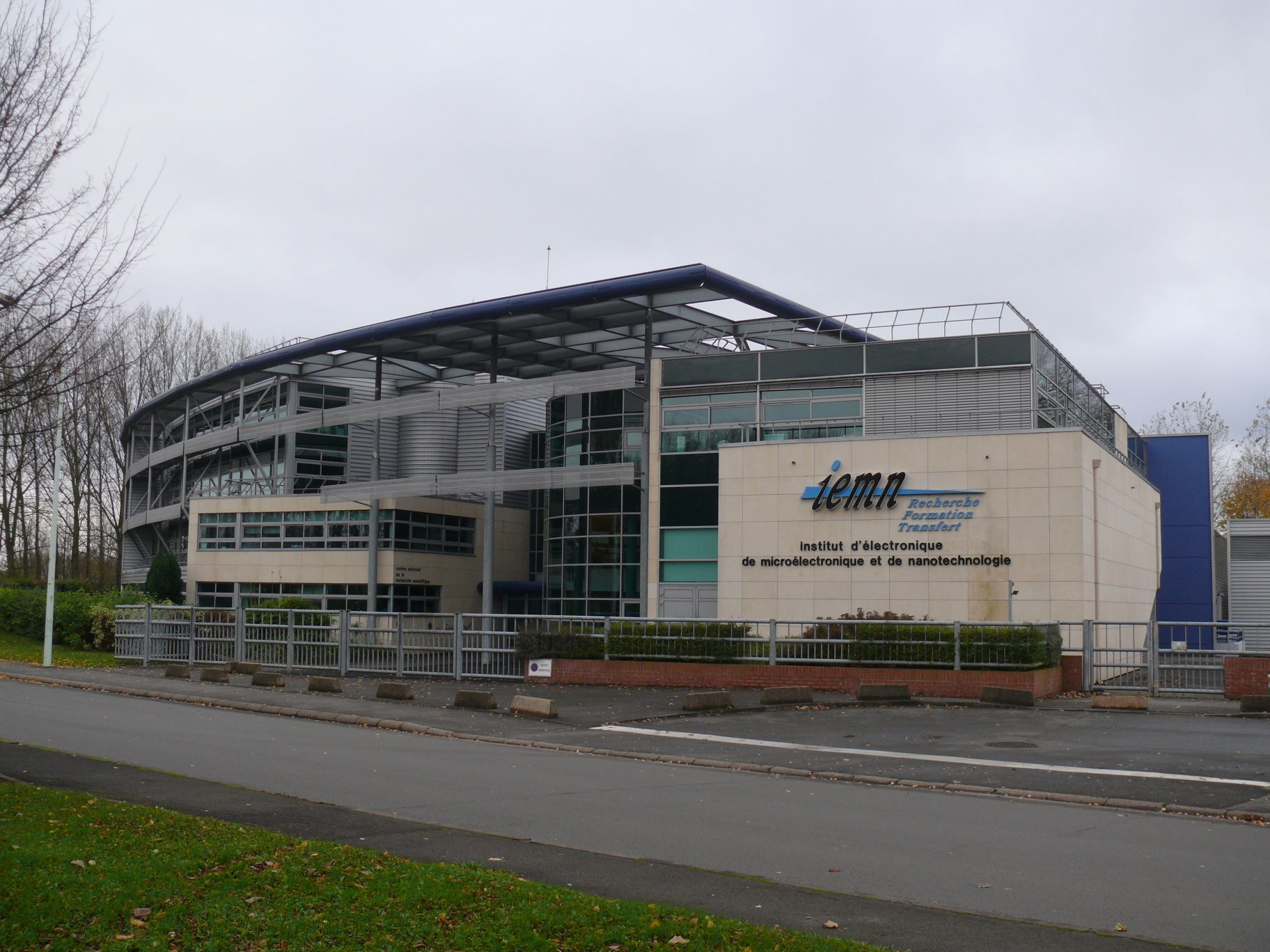
Institut d'électronique de microélectronique et de nanotechnologie (IEMN)

The Lille 1 University of Science and Technology (French: Université Lille 1 : Sciences et Technologies, USTL) was a French university located on a dedicated main campus in Villeneuve d'Ascq, near Lille (Hauts-de-France - European Metropolis of Lille), with 20,000 full-time students plus 14,500 students in continuing education (2004). 1,310 permanent faculty members plus 1,200 staff and around 140 CNRS researchers work there in the different University Lille 1 institutes and 43 research labs. University Lille 1 was a member of the European Doctoral College Lille Nord de France, which produces 400 doctorate dissertations every year. The university is ranked in the world top 200 universities in mathematics by the Shanghai ranking.

University Lille 1 was established as Faculty of Science in 1854 in Lille, although its academic roots extend back to 1559. It later moved to Villeneuve d'Ascq in 1967. The University focuses on science and technology. Law, business management and medical fields are taught in the independent campus of Université de Lille II, while literature and social sciences are taught as part of the independent campus of Université de Lille III. Altogether, the three university in Lille include more than 70,000 students and are the main parts of the Community of Universities and Institutions (COMUE) Lille Nord de France.

At the beginning of 2018, the three universities (Lille 1, Lille 2, Lille 3) merged to form the University of Lille; the UFRs of Lille 1 become Departments of the new Faculty of Science and Technology.

== University Lille 1 campus ==
The main University Lille 1 campus, referred-to as Cité Scientifique, is located in Villeneuve d'Ascq in the suburbs of Lille, and covers an area of 1.1 km^{2}. USTL also has secondary locations in the Lille historical city centre, Sallaumines, Tourcoing and Wimereux (Marine station).

University Lille 1 is located on the same Cité Scientifique campus as École nationale supérieure de chimie de Lille and Ecole Centrale de Lille; these independent entities have established a number of joint research laboratories with USTL.

== University Lille 1 faculties and doctoral college ==
University Lille 1 faculties include

- UFR biology
- UFR chemistry
- UFR geography
- UFR mathematics
- UFR physics
- UFR economy and social sciences
- UFR earth sciences
- UFR electronics, electrotechnics, control and computer sciences

In addition to standard science curricula, providing bachelor (licence), master and doctorate degrees, University Lille 1 also includes a number of specialized education and research units run by the university, for undergraduate and graduate students:

- Institut d'électronique de microélectronique et de nanotechnologie (IEMN) Electronics, micro- & nano-technologies
- École polytechnique universitaire de Lille (Polytech'Lille) Engineering
- fr:TELECOM Lille 1 Telecommunications
- fr:IUP MIAGE Information systems for business applications
- fr:IUP fr:GMI Maths & information theory
- fr:IUP Bio-technologies & Bio-industries
- fr:IUP Génie de l'environnement – Environment management
- Institut d'Aménagement et d'Urbanisme de Lille (IAUL) Urban engineering
- Institut universitaire de technologie (IUT "A" de Lille). Undergraduate courses in a variety of technologies

University Lille 1 has also its own business management school

- Institut d'Administration des Entreprises de Lille (IAE)

University Lille 1 participates in the European Doctoral College Lille Nord-Pas de Calais, which produces 400 doctorate dissertations per year.

== History ==
- 1559: Foundation of the University of Douai, 30 km south of Lille city centre, delivering courses in law and humanities
- 1854: Establishment of the Faculty of Sciences in Lille city, reporting to University of Douai, Louis Pasteur as first dean
- 1896: Transfer from the University of Douai to Lille
- 1970: Creation of the independent Université des Sciences et Technologies de Lille 1 (USTL) on a new campus (Cité Scientifique) in Lille suburb
- 2008: Enhanced research cooperation through Community of Universities and Institutions (COMUE) Lille Nord de France
- 2018: The university merged with University of Lille II and Université Lille 3 to form the new University of Lille

== Notable faculty and alumni ==
=== Faculty and staff ===
Faculty and staff in alphabetical order.

- Charles Barrois (1851-1939), professor, geologist.
- Émile Borel (1871-1956), mathematician and member of parliament.
- Pierre Bourdieu (1930-2002), lecturer, sociologist.
- Joseph Boussinesq (1842-1929), professor, mathematician, fluid mechanics specialist
- Henri Cartan (1904-2008), professor, mathematician.
- Albert Châtelet (1883-1960), professor, mathematician, politician.
- Claude Dubar (1945-2015), professor, sociology.
- Robert Gabillard (1926-2012), professor, co-inventor of [Véhicule Automatique Léger]
- Joseph Kampé de Fériet (1893-1982), professor, physicist, chairman of mechanics from 1930 to 1969.
- Henri de Lacaze-Duthiers (1821-1901), professor, anatomiste, biologist, zoologist.
- Claude Auguste Lamy (1820-1878), professor, chemist, discoverer of the element thallium.
- Szolem Mandelbrojt (1899-1983), professor, mathematician.
- Louis Pasteur (1822-1895), professor, chemist and microbiologist, first dean of the science faculty.
- Paul Painlevé (1863-1933), professor, mathematician.
- Henri Padé (1863-1953), professor, mathematician.
- Ernest Vessiot (1865-1952), professor, mathematician.

=== Alumni ===
Alumni in alphabetical order. This list includes alumni who are also faculty.

- Charles Barrois (1851-1939), professor, geologist.
- Louis Chauvel (1967-), professor, sociologist.
- Marc-Philippe Daubresse (1953-), mayor, member of parliament, French Minister for Youth and Active Solidarities.
- Louis Dollo (1857-1931), paleontologist
- Marc Drillech, sociologist and President of universities.
- Jean Théodore Delacour (1890-1985), doctor, ornithologist.
- Jean Hélion (1904-1987), painter.
- Jacky Hénin (1960-), politician.
- Vladimir Jankélévitch (1903-1985), philosopher, musicologist.
- Mohammad Ali Mojtahedi (1908-1997), Iranian university professor and lifetime principal of the Alborz High School in Tehran.
- Faustin-Archange Touadéra (1957-), professor of mathematics, rector of the University of Bangui and Prime Minister of the Central African Republic.
- See also Notable alumni and faculty from Université Lille Nord de France

== See also ==
- École Centrale de Lille
- École nationale supérieure de chimie de Lille
- ESDP-Network
- European Doctoral College Lille Nord-Pas de Calais
- Institut d'électronique de microélectronique et de nanotechnologie (IEMN)
- Institut d'électronique de microélectronique et de nanotechnologie
- Institut des molécules et de la matière condensée de Lille
- Laboratoire d'Informatique Fondamentale de Lille
- Laboratoire d'Automatique, Génie Informatique et Signal
- Laboratoire de mécanique de Lille
- Laboratoire d'électrotechnique et d'électronique de puissance de Lille
- TELECOM Lille 1
- Utrecht Network
