= ILIS =

Ilis or ILIS may refer to:

- Hilis, a village in the Khojali Rayon of Azerbaijan
- International Lesbian Information Service
- Institut Lillois d'Ingénierie de la Santé (Faculty of Engineering and Health Management - University of Lille)
- ILIS 1936, Internationella Luftfartsutställningen i Stockholm, a specialized World's fair held in Stockholm in 1936 and recognised by the Bureau of International Expositions
