= Lille 2 University of Health and Law =

French university

Coordinates: 50°37′53″N 3°04′32″E

- Université de Lille II
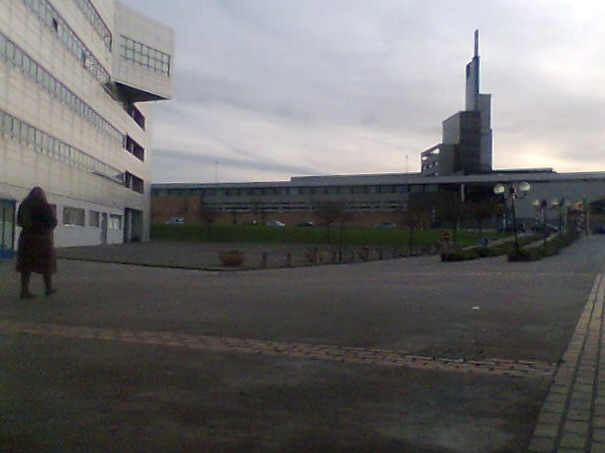
- Type: Public: Health, Sports, Management, Law
- Established: 1559; 1970 (current campus)
- Affiliations: Community of Universities and Institutions (COMUE) Lille Nord de France
- President: Pr. Xavier Vandendriessche
- Administrative staff: 1,050
- Students: 24,000
- Location: Lille, France
- Research labs: 50
- Website: http://www.univ-lille2.fr/en/welcome-to-university-of-health-and-law.html

The Lille 2 University of Health and Law (French: Université Lille 2 : Droit et Santé) was a French university for health, sports, management and law. It was located in Lille and was part of the Community of Universities and Institutions (COMUE) Lille Nord de France.

The University of Lille II inherits from the Faculty of Law established as the Université de Douai in 1559. After, sciences and technologies are taught in an independent campus of Université de Lille I - USTL, while literature and social sciences are taught as part of the independent campus of Université de Lille III - Charles de Gaulle. Altogether, the universities of Lille include more than 90,000 students and are the core parts of the European Doctoral College Lille-Nord-Pas de Calais that includes 3,000 PhD Doctorate students supported by university research laboratories.

Henri Warembourg was president of this university. His son, Nicolas Warembourg, is professor of law in Sorbonne.

Since 1970, the main campus of University de Lille II in situated in Ronchin, in the southern part of Lille.

It includes

- 24,000 students
- 1,050 faculty members and 830 staff
- 50 research labs, associated to the European Doctoral College Lille Nord-Pas de Calais
- 250 courses towards nationally accredited degrees and 170 courses towards university diploma.

At the beginning of 2018, the three universities of Lille (Lille 1, Lille 2, Lille 3) merged to form the University of Lille.

== Management institutes ==
=== List of Institutes ===
- Institut Universitaire de Technologie (I.U.T.) undergraduate courses
- Institut Universitaire Professionnel Management de la Distribution (I.M.D.)
- Ecole Supérieure des Affaires (E.S.A.)

=== ESA – Business Management School ===
ESA – Ecole Supérieure des Affaires is the Business management school of Université de Lille II and its curriculum relates to business administration, finance and banking management. It includes the following degrees delivered by University of Lille II :

- Licence degree
- Master's degree in Management & Business Administration (i.e. Master 'Sciences de Gestion - Administration des Affaires' M1+M2) with 5 elective mentions :
  - Banking
  - Accounting & audit
  - Finance
  - Business administration and entrepreneurship
  - Marketing
- Doctorate.

=== ESA – Business Management School ===
A double degree courses is established for selected graduate students from other schools, including the Master (M2) in Management & Business Administration as an elective part of their curriculum :

- Banking & Finance advanced program targeting engineer students from Ecole Centrale de Lille,
- Banking & Finance advanced program targeting finance students from Skema Business School,
- Patrimonial management programme targeting students from ISA Lille.

== Law faculties ==
- Faculté des Sciences Juridiques, Politiques et Sociales
- IEP Sciences-Po Lille Institut d'Etudes Politiques (I.E.P.) Sciences Po Lille
- Institut de préparation à l'Administration Générale (I.P.A.G.)
- Institut des Sciences du Travail (I.S.T.)
- Institut de la Construction, de l'Environnement et de l'Urbanisme (I.C.E.U.)
- Institut d'Etudes Judiciaires (I.E.J.)
- Institut de Criminologie
- Centre Universitaire de Cambrai
- Ecole Doctorale des Sciences Juridiques, Politiques Economiques et de Gestion

== Health faculties ==
- Faculté de Médecine Henri Warembourg
  - Ecole Doctorale de Biologie Santé
  - Institut de Médecine Légale (I.M.L.)
- Faculté des Sciences Pharmaceutiques et Biologiques
- Faculté de Chirurgie Dentaire
- Institut Lillois d'Ingénierie de la Santé (I.L.I.S.)
- Institut de Chimie Pharmaceutique Albert Lespagnol (I.C.P.A.L.)
- Institut d'Orthophonie "Gabriel Decroix"

== Sports faculty ==
- Faculté des Sciences du Sport et de l'Education Physique

== Doctoral college ==
- European Doctoral College Lille Nord-Pas de Calais

== Points of interest ==
- Jardin botanique de la Faculté de Pharmacie, a botanical garden

== Notable people ==
- Éric Dupond-Moretti (born 20 April 1961), a French-Italian criminal defence lawyer and politician serving as Minister of Justice since 2020. He studied law at Lille 2 University.
- Daniel Vincent (1874 - 1946), French politician who studied at Lille 2. He was a deputy from 1910 to 1927, then a senator from 1927 to 1941. During World War I (1914–18), he served as an aviator, then as under secretary of state for Aviation. He tried to make the aircraft industry more effective in delivering planes of sufficient quality and numbers. As Minister of Labor in 1921–22 he introduced France's first social insurance bill. He also served in various cabinets as Minister of Education, Minister of Commerce and Minister of Public Works.
- René Cassin, Nobel prize winner (1887 - 1976), a professor at the University of Lille 2 from 1920 to 1929.
- Guy Debeyre (1911 - 1998), a French academic, professor of private law at the University of Lille 2. He was rector of the Academy of Lille for 17 years, then deputy mayor of Lille.
- Angela Behelle (b.1971), novelist. She studied law at Lille 2 University.
- Frédéric Nihous (b.1967), politician. He studied law at Lille 2 University.
- Iris Mittenaere (b.1993), model, television host and Miss Universe 2016. She studied dentistry at the University of Lille 2
