= Unité de catalyse et de chimie du solide de Lille =

Coordinates: 50°36′22″N 3°08′14″E

Unité de catalyse et de chimie du solide de Lille (Laboratory of Catalysis and Solid State Chemistry - UCCS) is a French research laboratory (UMR CNRS 8181) focused on process engineering and chemical engineering.

It is located in Lille, Lens and Béthune and is a part of COMUE Lille Nord de France. It is affiliated to the Institut des molécules et de la matière condensée de Lille (IMMCL-Chevreul). UCCS research teams support academic activities in the following sites of the COMUE Lille Nord de France :

- École centrale de Lille
- École nationale supérieure de chimie de Lille
- University of Lille
- Artois University

It supports doctoral researches and hosts PhD doctoral candidates in relationship with the European Doctoral College Lille Nord de France.

== Research area ==
Research area are focused on :

- Catalysis
- Solid-state chemistry
- Process engineering

and are supported by large experimental installations in the research lab.
