= Hili =

Hili may be:

- Tikoloshe, Tokoloshe or Hili — a dwarf-like water Sprite (creature) or zombie, in Zulu mythology
- Hili, Dakshin Dinajpur — a border check-post in West Bengal, India
- Hili (community development block) - an administrative sub-district in Dakshin Dinajpur district in West Bengal, India
- Hili Railway Station - in Dinajpur District, Bangladesh
- Hilis (also, Ilis) — a village in the Khojali Rayon of Azerbaijan
- Hili, Al Ain — a district in the city of Al Ain, Emirate of Abu Dhabi, United Arab Emirates
- Davina Sammut Hili, Maltese politician
- The plural of the medical word hilus
