= Amandine Marshall =

French egyptologist

Dr. Amandine Marshall
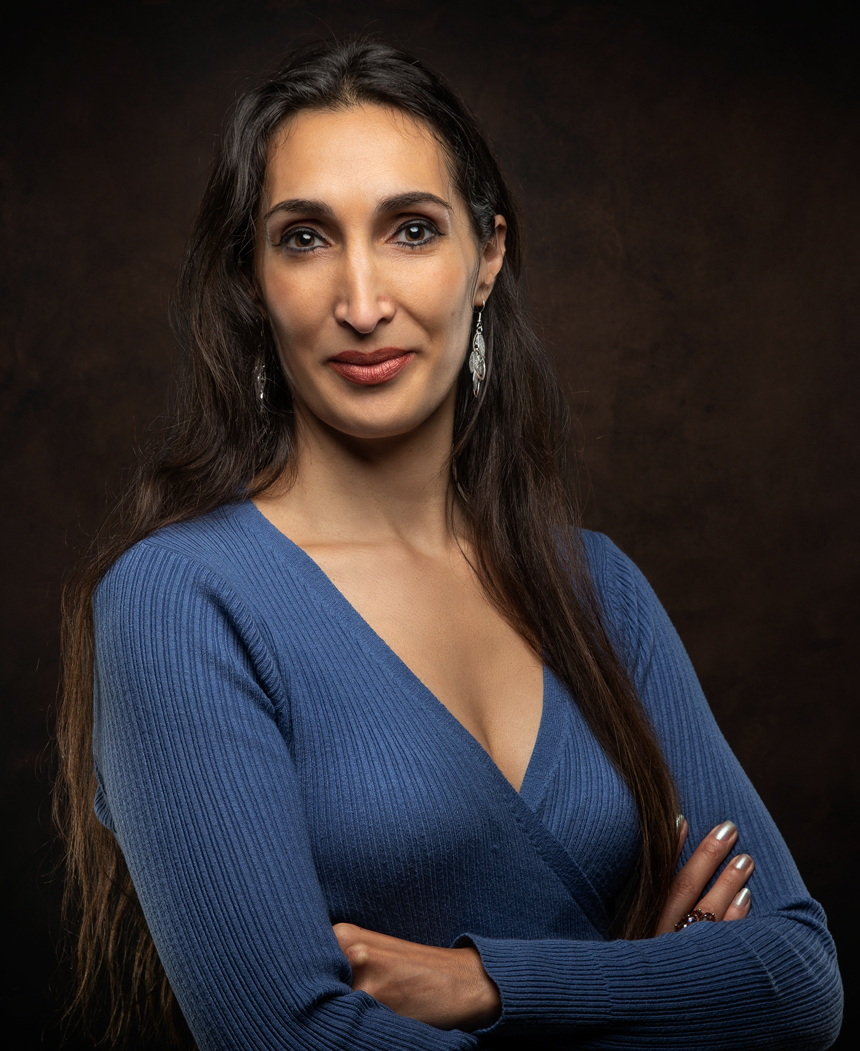
- in 2023
- Born: 29 November 1980 (age 45); Toulouse
- Education: Charles de Gaulle University – Lille III; EHESS
- Occupation: Egyptologist

Amandine Marshall (born 29 November 1980) is an Egyptologist, archaeologist and French author. She became an associate researcher at the French Archaeological Mission of Thebes West (MAFTO) in 2005.

== Early life and education ==
Marshall was born on 29 November 1980 in Toulouse, France. She graduated with a BA in Art History and Archeology from Charles de Gaulle University – Lille III in 2003 and a PhD in Social and Historical Anthropology, Egyptology from EHESS in 2013.

== Career ==
In 2005 Marshall became an associate researcher at the French Archaeological Mission of Thebes West (MAFTO).

Marshall is a doctor of the Ecole des Hautes Etudes en Sciences Sociales of Toulouse (School for Advanced Studies in the Social Sciences) after having supported a thesis titled "The children in ancient Egypt of the predynastic times at the end of the New Kingdom", in 2013. This research work has been the subject of a continuing publication by Éditions du Rocher.

One year after leading an unsuccessful project to create a museum in memory of the French Egyptologist Auguste Mariette, she published a biography of the French archaeologist in 2010. She has written several other works, especially for adults and children. Marshall participates in the excavations directed by Christian Leblanc on the site of the Ramesseum.

== Selected publications ==
=== Scientific works ===
- Marshall, Amandine (2018). The Child and Death in Ancient Egypt. Toulouse: Antiques World. p. 541. ISBN 979-10-699-1748-4.
- Marshall, Amandine (2015). Maternity and early childhood in ancient Egypt. Monaco: Editions du Rocher. p. 280. ISBN 9782268083155.
- Marshall, Amandine (2014). Being a child in ancient Egypt. Monaco: Editions du Rocher. p. 352. ISBN 9782268081540.
- Marshall, Amandine; Lichtenberg, Roger (2013). Egyptian Mummies: The Millennial Quest for a Different Technique History. Paris: Fayard. p. 272. ISBN 9782213680408.

=== Children's books ===
- Thoth tales: fables, tales and myths from ancient Egypt, 2019
- Dudu and the Cat goddess, 2018 (with Vinciane Schleef)
- Welcome to the school of the little scribes, 2016 (with Thierry Plus)
- Ancient Egypt, 2011
- Diary of a child in Ancient Egypt: Meryra, Set Maat, 1480 BC., 2004 (with Michaël Welply, Caroline Picard, Jérôme Brasseur and Jean-François Péneau)

=== Scientific articles ===
- Amandine Marshall, Pseudo-mummies, fake mummies and bodies delivered in "kit form", Ancient Egypt Magazine 107/18.5, London, 2018, p. 32-35.
- Amandine Marshall, Excavating at the Ramesseum, Ancient Egypt Magazine 104/18.2, London, 2017, p. 36-43.
- Amandine Marshall, About the efficacy of garlickly breath to predict a good delivery, Ancient Egypt Magazine 101/18.1, London, 2017, p. 25-27.
- Amandine Marshall, About the efficacy of Egyptian pregnancy tests, Ancient Egypt Magazine 97/17.1, London, 2016, p. 40-43.
- Amandine Marshall, About the efficacy of an Egyptian contraceptive with crocodile excrement, Ancient Egypt Magazine 96/16.6, London, 2016, p. 15-17.
- Amandine Marshall, About the efficacy of eating fly specks in ancient Egypt, Ancient Egypt Magazine 93/16.3, London, 2016, p. 15-17.
- Amandine Marshall, About the efficacy of eating a cooked mouse in ancient Egypt, Ancient Egypt Magazine 88/15.4, London, 2015, p. 40-42.
- Amandine Marshall, Fly & lion: military awards in ancient Egypt, Kmt : a Modern Journal of Ancient Egypt 26/3, Sebastopol, 2014, p. 39-47.
- Amandine Marshall, The child and the hoopoe , Kmt : a Modern Journal of Ancient Egypt 26/2, Sebastopol, 2014, p. 59-63.
- Amandine Marshall, On the origins of Egyptian mummification , Kmt : a Modern Journal of Ancient Egypt 25/2, Sebastopol, 2014, p. 52-57.
