= Holly Branigan =

Scottish academic

- Other name: Holly P Branigan
- Occupations: Professor of Language and Cognition Head of School of Philosophy, Psychology and Language Sciences at the University of Edinburgh
- Awards: Fellow of the Royal Society of Edinburgh

Academic background
- Education: University of York Université de Lille iii University of Edinburgh

Academic work
- Discipline: Psychology Language Cognition

Holly Branigan FRSE is a Professor of Psychology of Language and Cognition and Head of the School of Philosophy, Psychology and Language Sciences at the University of Edinburgh, Scotland.

== Education ==
Branigan has attended the University of York, the Université de Lille III and the University of Edinburgh. She completed her PhD in Cognitive Science at the University of Edinburgh in 1995.

== Career ==
Branigan's research interests include language production, communication, language learning/development and language processing. Her research covers typically and atypically developing children, mono and bilingual adults and a wide range of languages.

Branigan became the Head of the School of Philosophy, Psychology and Language Studies at the University of Edinburgh in 2018; having been Deputy Head since 2016.

== Awards ==
In March 2021, Branigan was selected as a Fellow by the Royal Society of Edinburgh.
