= Bernadette Andreosso-O'Callaghan =

Irish economist

Bernadette Andreosso-O'Callaghan holds the Jean Monnet Chair of Economics at the University of Limerick in Ireland (since 1995) and is Director of the Centre for European Studies at the University of Limerick. Her major research interests lie in the area of economic integration, with a particular focus on EU-Asia relations, and on structural change in European and Asian countries.

She is educated at the University of Franche-Comté (maîtrise in economics 1977–1981), the College of Europe in Bruges, Belgium (1981–1982 Johan Willem Beyen promotion), the University of Paris 1 Pantheon-Sorbonne (Master of Advanced Studies 1982–1983) and Lille University of Science and Technology (doctorate in Economic Integration 1983–1986).
