= Institut des molécules et de la matière condensée de Lille =

The Institut des molécules et de la matière condensée de Lille - IMMCL Chevreul ( Institute for molecules and condensed matter in Lille) is a physics and chemistry research institute. It is a member of the University of Lille.

== Background history ==
Academic researches in chemistry in Lille started in the early days of the 19th century, with Charles Frédéric Kuhlmann's innovations on sulfuric acid production and researches on using platinum catalysis for industrial production of nitric acid from ammonia (from 1823 to 1833). The faculty of sciences of Lille was however formally established in 1854 only, with a chemist as its first dean (Louis Pasteur). Hence, academic and applied researches in chemistry, catalysis, and later molecular physics, were boosted from the 19th century onwards and further developed in the 20th and 21st centuries, both in fundamental research and applied research thanks to industry applications. (Source: History of chemistry education and research in Lille university)

== Locations ==
- Cité Scientifique: IMMCL main site is located in University of Lille Science campus. The institute researchers and the different experimentation labs are hosted in several buildings on the campus, including
  - own IMMCL buildings
  - École nationale supérieure de chimie de Lille
  - École centrale de Lille (catalysis labs and chemical engineering labs).
- Other campus : Facilities for researchers experimentations are also available in the following remote sites
  - Catalysis labs at campus Artois
  - Condensed matter thermo-physics labs (LTPMC) at campus Littoral
  - INSERM unit 761 – Biostructures and Drug Discovery.

== Research labs ==
IMMCL research laboratories are accredited as French National Centre for Scientific Research (CNRS) laboratories.

The different laboratories of the institute include :

- Laboratory for structure and properties of solid state (LSPES), UMR CNRS 8008
- Laboratory for organic chemistry and macro-molecular chemistry (LCOM), UMR CNRS 8009
- Laboratory of catalysis of Lille (LCL)- UMR CNRS 8010 and Unit for catalysis and solid chemistry (UCCS) - UMR CNRS 8181
- Laboratory of crystal chemistry and physico-chemistry of solids (LCPS), UMR CNRS 8012
- Laboratory for dynamics and structural properties of molecular matters LDSMM, UMR CNRS 8024
- Laboratory for metallurgy and material science, UMR CNRS 8517.

== Research area and doctoral college ==
IMMCL research roadmap include the following area:

- Polymers and organic functional materials
- Material oxides and catalysis
- Complex molecular liquids
- Organic and bio-organic synthesis
- Metallurgy and materials for energy
- Coerced and forced materials .

They are integrated into the European Doctoral College Lille Nord de France and especially as part of its doctoral school science of materials, radiations and environment (SMRE) supported along with other research laboratories from the COMUE Lille Nord de France.
