= Nicolas Warembourg =

French jurist

- Occupation: Professor of Law

Academic background
- Education: University of Paris 1 Pantheon-Sorbonne

Academic work
- Discipline: Law
- Sub-discipline: Public law Constitutional law Civil liberties

Nicolas Warembourg (born the 25th March 1974) is a French jurist, professor of Law at the Sorbonne.

He specializes in historic, public and constitutional law.

He is regularly interviewed. He is highly specialized regarding Guy Coquille.

== Training ==
He holds his PhD in Law from Lille 2 University of Health and Law. He is a professor at the Sorbonne Law School.

== Publications ==
- Nicolas Warembourg, Guy Coquille et le droit français : Le droit commun coutumier dans la doctrine juridique du XVIè siècle, 2005, 864 p.
- Nicolas Warembourg, La déposition du pape hérétique : lieux théologiques, modèles canoniques, enjeux constitutionnels, Editions Mare & Martin, 2005, Presses universitaires de Sceaux, 222 p.
- Nicolas Warembourg, L'écho des lois : du parchemin à internet, La Documentation française, 2012, 157 p.
- Nicolas Warembourg, Introduction historique au droit privé : Tome 1, les personnes, Presses Universitaires de France, 2019
- Nicolas Warembourg, Introduction historique au droit privé : Tome 2, La responsabilité, Presses Universitaires de France, 2020
- Nicolas Warembourg, Introduction historique au droit privé : Tome 3, Actions, obligations, Presses Universitaires de France, 2022

== Article (selection) ==
- Nicolas Warembourg, « Lire, voir, entendre - LEVY (Thierry) et ROYER (Jean-Pierre), Labori, un avocat pour Zola, pour Dreyfus, contre la terre entière, Paris : éditions Louis Audibert, 2006. », Les Cahiers de la justice, Dalloz, N° 1, 2008, p. 153
- Collectif, Henri Lévy-Bruhl, Mare & Martin, 350 p.
