= Guy Coquille =

French jurist (1523–1603)

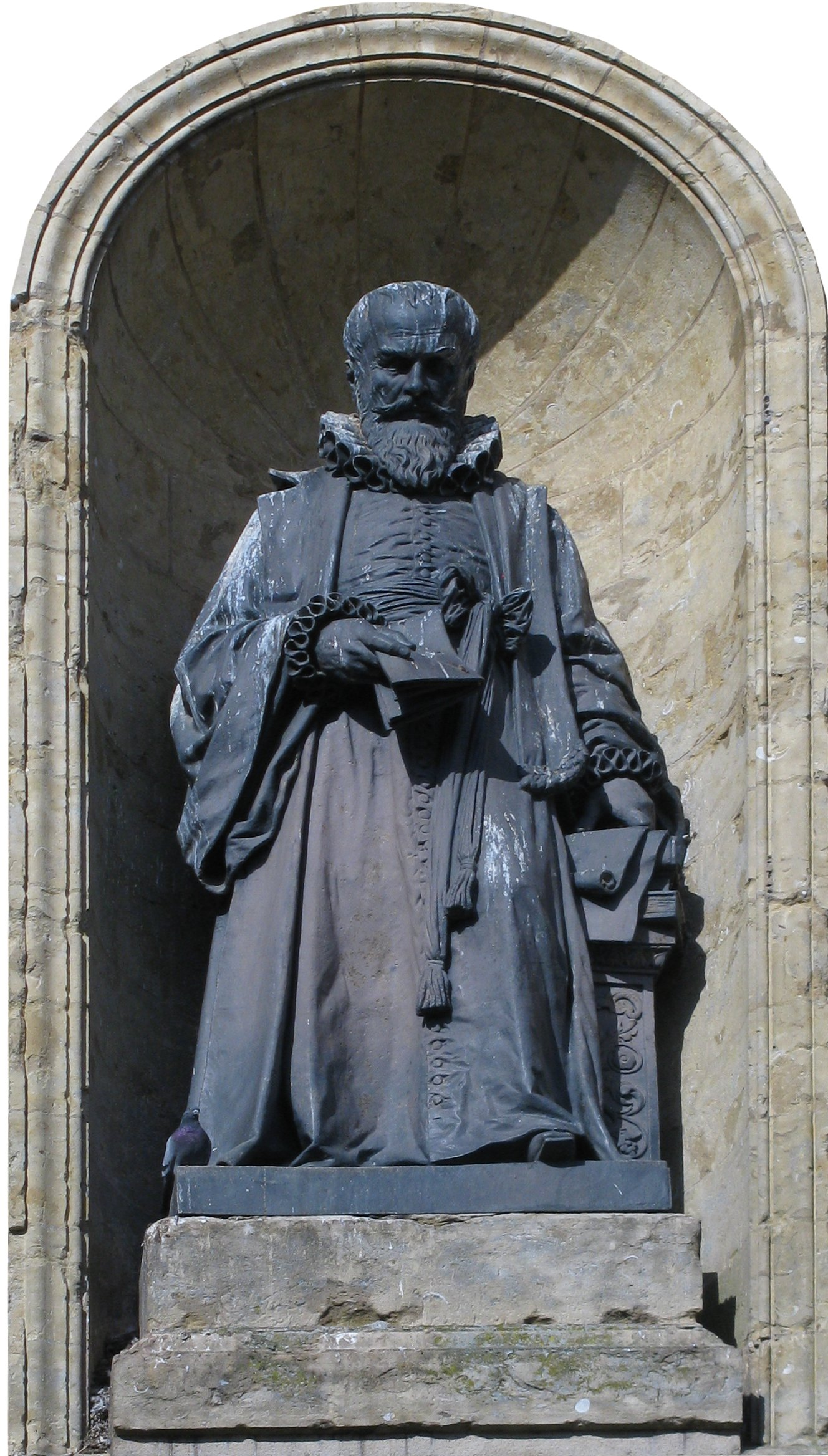
Statue representing Guy Coquille, by sculptor Louis Rochet. It adorns the clock tower in the town of Decize (Nièvre, France), inaugurated on September 23, 1849.

Guy Coquille (1523, Decize – 1603), also known by the Latinized name Conchyleus, was a French jurist.

He studied the humanities at the Collège de Navarre in Paris from 1532 to 1539, before pursuing legal studies at the universities of Padua and Orléans. In 1550, Coquille began practicing law in Paris, and in 1559 he relocated to Nevers, where he served as an advocate before the Parlement. He represented the Third Estate of his province in the French States-General of 1560, 1576, and 1588. From 1571 onward, he held the office of procureur fiscal to the Duke of Nevers.

All of Coquille's writings were published posthumously. His major works include Institutions au droit des Francois, ou Nouvelle Conférence des Coutumes de France (1607) and Questions et responses sur les Coutumes de France (1611). These texts aimed to provide a comprehensive account of French law, independent of its derivation from either Roman law or customary (common) law. This approach marked a significant development in 16th-century French legal scholarship and influenced later legal traditions across Europe.

== Bibliography ==
- Holthöfer, Ernst (2001). "Coquille, Guy". In Michael Stolleis (ed.). Juristen: ein biographisches Lexikon; von der Antike bis zum 20. Jahrhundert (in German) (2nd ed.). München: Beck. p. 143. ISBN 3-406-45957-9.
- Guy Thuillier, Guy Coquille et les auteurs nivernais du XVIème siècle, Nevers : Bibliothèque Municipale de Nevers : Société Académique du Nivernais, 2003
- Nicolas Warembourg, Guy Coquille et le droit français : Le droit commun coutumier dans la doctrine juridique du XVIè siècle, 2005, 864 p.
