= Institut d'électronique de microélectronique et de nanotechnologie =

Research institute in France

Coordinates: 50°36′22″N 3°08′10″E

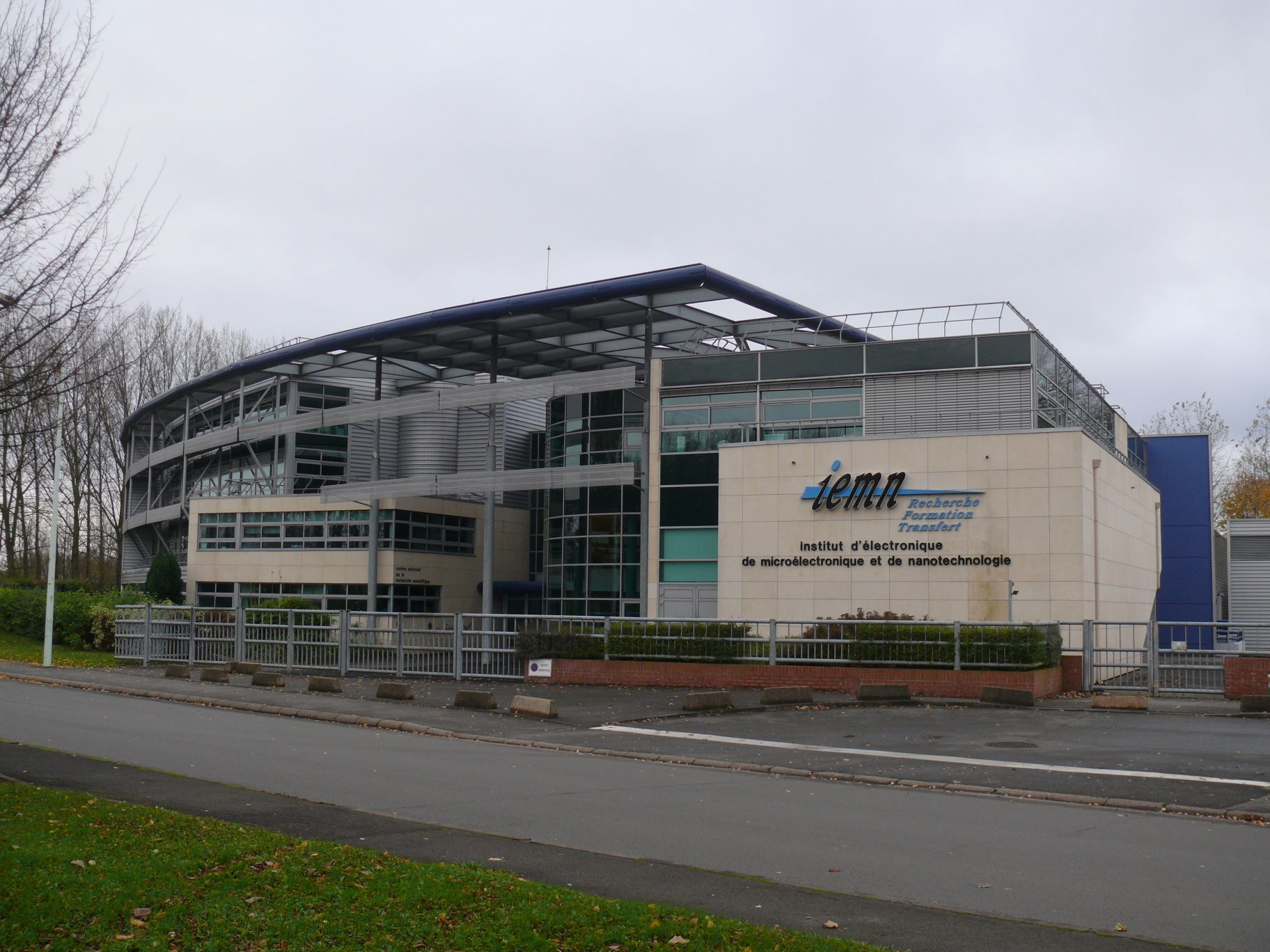
Institut d'électronique de microélectronique et de nanotechnologie (IEMN)

The Institute of Electronics, Microelectronics and Nanotechnology or IEMN (Institut d'électronique de microélectronique et de nanotechnologie in French) is a research institute of University of Lille, CNRS and École Centrale de Lille (UMR CNRS 8520).

== IEMN research activities ==
The main research focus is in six major scientific areas :

- Materials and Nanostructures Physics,
- Microtechnologies - Microsystems,
- Micro and optoelectronics,
- Communication circuits and systems,
- Acoustics,
- Instrumentation.

With 200 permanent researchers and 100 doctoral students for a total staff of more than 500, IEMN focuses on the following research area: physics of matter, nanostructures, microsystems and microtechnologies, microwave components and microelectronic circuits, RF and microwave circuits, digital communications, optoelectronics and photonic circuits, acoustic and ultrasonic sensors, microwave instrumentation.

== IEMN labs sites ==
- IEMN central laboratory : The 12,000 m² premises of IEMN central laboratory are located in University of Lille Science campus at Villeneuve d'Ascq. The site is 200 metres far from the Ecole Centrale de Lille and near metro access Quatre Cantons. IEMN premises include 2,000 m² of cleanroom.
- IEMN - Antenne USTL : This IEMN site is also located in University of Lille Science campus at Villeneuve d'Ascq and near metro access Cité scientifique.
- IEMN - Antenne OAE : This IEMN site is located in Campus Valenciennes
- IEMN - Antenne ISEN : This IEMN site is located at Institut supérieur de l'électronique et du numérique (ISEN) in Lille historical centre.

== See also ==
- Institut des molécules et de la matière condensée de Lille
