= Éric Pichet =

French economist (born 1960)

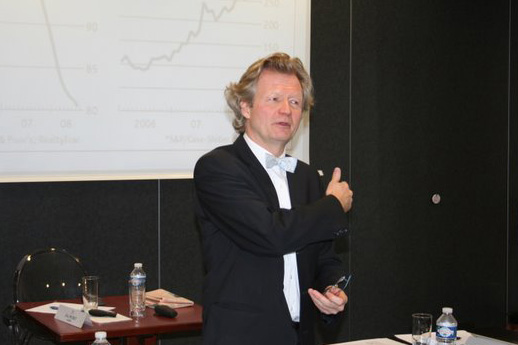
- Éric Pichet, seminar in November 2012
- Born: July 23, 1960 (age 66); Tananarive (Madagascar)

Academic background
- Education: HEC Paris; University of the Littoral Opal Coast (Doctorate) 2006; Panthéon-Assas University
- Influences: Paul Feyerabend, Sigmund Freud, Pierre Bourdieu, Maurice Allais, Adam Smith, Raymond Barre, Joseph Schumpeter, Raymond Boudon

Academic work
- Discipline: Corporate governance, Economics of Taxation, Epistemology for the Social Sciences

Éric Pichet (born in 1960) is a French economist and a post-graduate professor at KEDGE Business School. His main areas of expertise include market finance, monetary economics, fiscal economics, corporate governance and fiscal governance.

== Biography ==
Eric Pichet is a graduate of HEC Paris, ESORSEM (French Staff College) and IMPI (postgraduate programme in Wealth Management and Real Estate of Kedge Business School). He has a Ph.D in Management from the University of the Littoral Opal Coast with a thesis entitled "Convergence between Corporate Governance Practices in the large listed companies". In 2008, he qualified an HDR Ph.D supervisor at the same university with dissertation entitled "An Hypermodern Analysis of Contemporary Social Governances". He obtained a Phd in Law from l'Université Panthéon-Assas with a thesis entitled « Towards a General Theory of Social and Tax Expenditures »

Pichet began his career at French stockbroker CHOLET DUPONT before moving on to HSBC where he traded options and derivatives before becoming a financial analyst and joining France's SFAF (French Society of Financial Analysts). He has also worked as an independent financial expert and acted in an independent director's capacity since 2004. He is a member of the IFA French Directors Institute's research centre and sits on the boards of several investment companies in France, including Gestion 21 and Signaux Girod (also Chairman of the audit Committee). Pichet works with some publicly listed international hedge funds outside France and is Chairman of the Board of Directors at Diapason. Lastly, he belongs to the APM (Association for Progress in Management), where he also works in an expert's capacity, and is chairman at CORAL, a French think tank of authors, book publishers and editors.

Currently employed as Professor of Economics at KEDGE Business School, since 2000 he has also been Director of KEDGE's postgraduate IMPI Wealth & Real Estate Institute (IMPI). Pichet is a fellow at the Royal Institution of Chartered Surveyors, an Associate Researcher at the University of Bordeaux IV LAREFI research centre and CEFEP Research center at the University of PANTHEON-ASSAS and, since 1990 Professor at the SFAF Training Centre. In 2011, he published a methodological guide for research professors seeking a French HDR Ph.D supervision qualification. The book, entitled "Art of the HDR", contains advice on writing HDR dissertations and supervising Ph.D candidates. In 2019 he published a methodological and practical guide for PhD students in social sciences. The book entitled "L'Aventure de la Thèse" contains global advice on Pdh Dissertation.

== Theories ==
Éric Pichet has developed theories in different areas.

=== Corporate governance theories ===
==== Enlightened shareholder theory ====
Enlightened Shareholder Theory is an advanced and essentially shareholder-oriented corporate governance theory. The rest of Pichet's body of work in this area, including his 2006 PhD thesis on the "Convergence between corporate governance practices in large publicly listed companies with diffuse shareholdings", allows him to define three main categories of governance principles that can be applied in large publicly listed companies. These principles :

- Ensure the transparency of corporate information
- Ensure shareholder control of the company, specifically via balanced boards (mixing independent directors with different competencies) and optimised board procedures.
- Enable the whole of the board to participate in corporate strategising, not just the CEO.

==== Financial Institution governance theories ====
After analysing the role that failed governance mechanisms played in the Kerviel affair, Pichet detects a need for major improvements in the governance of large financial institutions, based on:

- Large banks' internal control systems reporting to the board instead of to the executive
- Boards being able to hire financial market specialists to develop greater authority in this area
- A systematic development of specialist board committees, notably for strategy and risk control purposes

More generally, having analysed financial institutions that made huge losses in 2007–2010, he identifies 6 symptoms that are always present under these conditions, which create an explosive cocktail when combined. The symptoms include:

1. Having a power-hungry and authoritarian leader (Richard Fuld at Lehman, Sean FitzPatrick at Anglo Irish Bank) driven by an insatiable need for social recognition and obsessed by the desire to unseat the current leader (Goldman Sachs, in this instance).
2. Failed internal governance systems, always involving the board of directors, who on each occasion turned out to be incompetent in terms of managing their strategic control function, and/or too subservient to the executive.
3. An almost unlimited ability to access cheap short-term funding.
4. Massive investment of short-term borrowings in high yield assets with over-estimated safety and liquidity. Between 2002 and 2006 this was best exemplified by direct or indirect investments in property; mortgage loans backed by property assets (i.e. Northern Rock); or lastly, investments in other assets index-linked to property or property loans, such as CDOs, subprimes, etc.
5. Excessive gearing, frequently 20 or 30 times the equity investment on these operations.
6. Failed external regulation mechanisms, due either to excessive complicity between regulators, governments and large financial institutions (Iceland, Ireland); incompetent regulators (Iceland); or insufficient monitoring (the Bank of England's "light touch" regulation). Note other dysfunctions, such as the fact that the Fed never tries to burst asset bubbles; a poor distribution of tasks among different regulatory bodies (in the UK, between the FSA, Bank of England and HM Treasury; in the US, the Fed's failure to monitor investment banks); or outright complicity with the institutions that the regulators were supposed to control (as in Ireland).

When all six conditions are met, financial institutions can experience major losses causing them to collapse (Lehman Brothers). Fundamentally, this is an example of systemic risk. As Pichet teaches students, "The needle that pops the balloon (i.e. subprime loans) is just the trigger for the crisis, not the root cause".

The best way of avoiding future financial failures is to:

- Ensure that large banks provide transparent information
- Reinforce boards' authority and ability to control corporate strategy
- Enhance regulatory quality

He also criticises three legislative trends that began after the crisis:

- Too many purely formal regulations (like Dodd Frank),
- The illusion that splitting commercial and investment banking offers a viable solution
- Banning short sales, which has no impact on price changes

=== Tax theory ===
==== Wealth tax Theory and political consequences ====
Although Pichet does not contest the theoretical utility of wealth taxes in modern fiscal systems, his analysis of the economic consequences of the ISF French Wealth Tax led him to the conclusion that this particular levy yields half as much as it costs in lost revenue. He took clearly position against the "French utopia" of a Global tax on the Superrich.

His research fuels the debate set up in the US by Senator Elizabeth Warren about the possibility of an annual tax on household wealth of 2 percent on net wealth above $50 million and 3 percent on net wealth above $1 billion.

==== Optimal taxation theory ====
Having authored two biographies about Adam Smith, a strong influence in his writings, Pichet's idea is that taxation must be based on four principles formulated by Smith in "An Inquiry into the Nature and Causes of the Wealth of Nations", albeit only after adapting them to the 21st century:

- Fairness: taxes must be paid according to each person's resources and must integrate the Polluter Pays Principle,
- Judicial Security: prohibition not only of all forms of arbitrariness but also all forms of insecurity for however long the taxpayer needs to manage the incentives associated with the initial measure,
- Savings principle. Taxes must be as low as possible to avoid harming economic development. This explains why in 2011 Pichet advocated doing anything possible to reduce the deficit. He disagreed, however, with the proposal that France's Fillon government put forward in its September 2011 second Budget reading to raise taxes by €11 billion and cut spending by €1 billion. Rather than this to sustain the country's growth dynamic, he suggested parity between tax rises and spending cuts.
- Convenience principle. Tax payments need to be made easy for taxpayers. This is congruent with the principle of intelligible taxation that France's Constitutional Council enacted around the turn of the century.

==== General Theory of Social and Tax Expenditures ====
In an initial study published 5 April 2012 in La Revue de droit fiscal Pichet distinguishes between simple tax determination modalities and actual tax loopholes, his idea being that fiscal advantages (like family allowances) awarded to dependent or disabled persons do not constitute tax loopholes but are instead ways of determining the amount of tax owed in France's benchmark tax system. His suggestion was that tax expenditures that are illegitimate (because they lack incentivising effects or are too costly or unfair) be eliminated. He set up a methodology that can be used to assess tax loopholes in terms of their level of usefulness and to eliminate any tax expenditures that serve no purpose.

In 2016, Pichet published his General Theory of Social and Tax Expenditures in an article published in La Revue de droit fiscal dated 8 September 2016. The theory is based on the idea that all compulsory levy systems are divided into six main categories called specific tax reference segments, each featuring a set of homogeneous fiscal standards enabling a methodical identification of relevant social and tax expenditures. Pichet followed this up with a rigorous doctrine in which individual exception provisions are identified using a series of six successive filters analysing their legitimacy, utility, relevance, efficiency, effectiveness and social acceptability. The analysis is prescriptive in nature and leads to a general doctrine in which each specific reference segment can be monitored.

By including tax and social loopholes, Pichet theory achieves a more specific definition of social and tax expenditures, being 'Any legislative, regulatory or administrative provision whose implementation translates into a public administration losing receipts that can be replaced by a budgetary expenditure; and which directly or indirectly reduces certain categories of taxpayers' compulsory levies compared to what they would have paid had norms emanating from general legal principles been applied in the specific tax reference segment in question'.

==== Optimal income and wealth tax theory; the notion of fiscal exile ====
In a research paper published in the French Review La Revue de droit fiscal on November 15, 2012, and in line with Arthur Laffer, Pichet explains that there is an optimal threshold above which tax yields decrease and become both marginally and globally negative due to the diminishing attractiveness of the country implementing the tax and international competition. Pichet has invented the expression "Fiscalité au Bollinger" or "Champagne Taxation" to illustrate this theory.

=== Theory of central banking ===
Drawing lessons from the 2008 financial crisis, in a May 2013 Journal of Governance and Regulation article Pichet suggests a new central banking theory for the world's older industrialised countries. The idea is that central bankers in the Global North failed to anticipate the crisis but were still able to adopt emergency measures saving the banking and financial systems: conventional measures such as massive cuts in interest rates (and a similarly massive injection of liquidities into the bank system in exchange for strong guarantees, i.e. financial assets with an at least BBB− rating); and non-conventional measures, including huge purchases of state debt. The article strongly criticises the European Central Bank's May 2010 decision to purchase Greek state debt in large quantities (totalling €40 billion by 2013) at a time when the country was being downgraded. This policy ran counter to prudential doctrine, according to which central banks are only supposed to purchase investment grade assets. It also failed to lower Greek Treasury bond yields and exposed the ECB to heavy losses in case Greece defaulted. This contrasted with the actions taken by the US and UK central banks, who bought secure AA+ rated securities issued by their national governments.

Hence Pichet's suggestion of a new doctrine appropriate for 21st century central banking, one redefining the concept of inflation to include not only consumer prices but also asset inflation, including shares, property and even bond market bubbles. There should also be a new tool distinguishing benign from dangerous asset inflation, with central banks being given a new mission of controlling leveraged asset price rises, based on the ready availability of short-term credit. Lastly, Pichet advocates reshaping central banks' governance systems along three lines: independence (essential, notwithstanding certain actions taken by Japanese and Hungarian governments in 2013); accountability, based on greater strategic transparency; and redrawn boards of directors, not only featuring a better gender balance (an ongoing challenge, as witnessed by arguments about the BCE's 100% male board) but also and above all by co-opting members from a wider range of backgrounds. In his view, it is clear that appointing governors without any trading experience was a major factor in the BCE's strategic mistake of purchasing huge quantities of Greek state debt, subjecting taxpayers across the Eurozone to huge levels of risk.

== Participation in taxation debates ==
=== Tax amnesty ===
In 2004, Pichet and attorney Maurice Christian Bergerès co-authored a study into the economic advantages of a tax amnesty.

=== Debates on the consequences of the « Trente Six Dispendieuses » ===
"Trente Six Dispendieuses" (36 year bust or 1981–2016 years of extravagant spending from 1981-2011).

=== Debates on the French structural public deficit ===
An article appearing in the 27 November 2014 issue of the Revue de Droit Fiscal has shown that the 2014 the French structural public deficit will be closer to 4% than the official 2.4%, due to the fact that the nation's growth potential has fallen by 1% per annum since the 2008 crisis broke out. This means it will be impossible to catch up with the pre-crisis growth trendline. Although the article contests neither the Haut Conseil des Finances Publiques' independence or competency, it does criticize this body's excessive caution and refusal to analyse the Government's calculations with any degree of seriousness. The Revue de Droit Fiscal article published in response by Mr. Migaud, in his capacity as Chair of the Haut Conseil des Finances Publiques, states that "Even if the Haut Conseil is not providing quantitative estimates for the output gap and structural deficit - estimates that would, by their very nature, be highly uncertain - it is clear in noting that the output gap that will be much lower than the one calculated by the Government, meaning that the structural deficit will be much higher".

=== The future of the French CADES and French tax innovation named CRDS ===
In a first paper published in 2000, Pichet analysed the French legislator's to limit the life of the CADES Welfare Debt Repayment Fund and the CRDS Welfare Debt Repayment Tax both created in 1996 to enable full redemption of all outstanding debts that the different branches of the French Social Security system had accumulated over the period 1993-1995. He had doubted of the deadline fixed by the year 2008. In a second paper published in 2003 he announced that the CADES fund and the CRDS tax would be being turned into permanent fixtures in France's budgetary and fiscal landscape.

In May 2020 he published a paper showing that after several decisions pushing the Fund's dissolution date back to 2024, thecovid-19 crisis having to contend with terrifying deficits in the country's Health Insurance system, another reopening of the CADES fund was decided in May 2020 in order to postpone it again to 2033. Therefor there is little doubt that the CADES and CRDS are immortal. Moreover together with VAT, created in 1954 and imitated throughout the world, the CRDS is undoubtedly the greatest French innovation in the 20 tt century in terms of compulsory taxation.

== Public asset research ==
A June 2005 study published in the Politiques et Management Public magazine suggested creating a new field of scientific research operating at the border between economics and financial analysis – public asset research, based on a methodology that would count all assets held by the State (including intangible assets such as telephone frequency rights), together with all debts, from the explicit (State debt as per the Maastricht definition) to the implicit, like pension liabilities for civil servants. Having assessed the French State's net asset value at €1.1 trillion as of 1 January 2004, with total debt (implicit and explicit combined) reaching €2.5 trillion, the French State counted net liabilities of €1.4 trillion, much higher than in 1980.

== Epistemology for the Social Sciences ==
Influenced by the thinking of Kurt Lewin, according to whom "Nothing is more practical than a good theory", Pichet always tries to develop social science theories that have practical consequences. Also influenced by Paul Feyerabend, he maintains the necessity of a constructivist epistemology that is specific to social sciences.

"If we consider the most complex object in the universe (besides the universe itself) to be the human brain, then human societies, and particularly the societies of the hypermodern era into which we have entered and which are the fruit of the interaction of thousands of human minds, and even, since globalisation and the advent of the internet, of the interaction of billions of human minds, are far and away the most complex entities there are to study".

== Debates on the future of the Bitcoin ==
In an article published in the French Edition of The Conversation dated 28 November 2017 Pichet warns against the bubble of the Bitcoin: "the raise of the Bitcoin above 10 000 dollars is typically an archetypal bubble Like all crypto-currencies, it has no intrinsic value, not even as a collector's item, due to its immateriality. As a result and unlike official currencies, it can never be booked as a central bank or financial institution liability. Nor is it a financial asset like a stock or bond, since it generates no return. The only investment value resides in the higher price that prospective buyers are willing to pay. In short, bitcoin is a commodity lacking an underlying asset, with investors only able to recover their initial currency stake if someone buys their holdings off of them.
Even more than the 2000 dot.com bubble, this speculative instrument probably constitutes the first hyper-modern bubble, given its complete immateriality. The globalised network means there are potentially 7 billion buyers (especially since it can be divided up to eight decimal points), largely explaining the funnel effect materialising, inter alia, in the first bitcoin futures contract that began trading in December 2017."

However, he notes that blockchain and decentralised transaction validation mechanisms hold real promise and are likely to become the most interesting legacy from this adventure. In the future, secure decentralised systems using blockchain-like innovations will rival traditional trusted third parties (banks, notaries, etc.), if only because they cost less.

Any remotely lucid observer knows that even if it were possible to short-sell bitcoin, the strategy is prohibited and potentially disastrous. After all, it is impossible to predict how long and how high this speculative wave is going to go. As Keynes once wrote, "A market can remain irrational longer than you can remain solvent". All that is left is to sit this one out and wait for the rivers of fortune to carry off bitcoin and its debris.

== Publications ==
- 2001: Éric Pichet. Adam Smith, je connais !, Publisher: Mallard.
- 2003: Éric Pichet. Adam Smith, le père de l'économie, Publisher: Les éditions du siècle.
- 2004: Éric Pichet. Ricardo, le premier théoricien de l'économie, Publisher: Les éditions du siècle.
- 2005: Éric Pichet, avec Marie Grozieux de Laguerenne. Le Family Office, Publisher: Les éditions du siècle.
- 2007: Éric Pichet. Le guide pratique des obligations, 2ème édition, Publisher: SEFI.
- 2008: Éric Pichet. Le guide pratique de la Bourse, 3e édition, Publisher: SEFI.
- 2008: Éric Pichet. Les Hedge Funds : théorie et pratiques, Publisher: Les éditions du siècle.
- 2009: Éric Pichet. Le gouvernement d'entreprise dans les grandes sociétés cotées, Publisher: Les éditions du siècle.
- 2011: Éric Pichet. L'art de l'HDR, Publisher: Les Éditions du Siècle.
- 2016: Éric Pichet. Théorie générale des dépenses socio-fiscales, Publisher: Les Éditions du Siècle.
- 2018: Éric Pichet. Le guide pratique des options et du Monep, 8e édition, Publisher: SEFI.
- 2021: Éric Pichet. L'impôt sur le revenu 2021, Théorie et Pratiques, 22e édition, Publisher: Les Éditions du Siècle.
- 2021: Éric Pichet. L'Impôt sur la fortune (IFI) 2021, Théorie et Pratiques, 22e édition, Publisher: Les Éditions du Siècle.
- 2019: Éric Pichet. L'Aventure de la Thèse, Publisher: Les Éditions du Siècle.

Eric Pichet has translated into French three of the leading books in American stock market literature:

- Reminiscences of a Stock Operator, by Edwin Lefèvre published in 1924 in the United States. The bible for traders describes the life of James Livermore and gives advice that have become part of finance vernacular such as 'shares are never too low to sell and never too high to buy'.
- A Random Walk Down Wall Street by Burton Malkiel.
- Where are the Customers Yachts ? by Schwed, Mais où sont les yachts des clients ?, which Éric Pichet often presents to his students as the funniest and most pertinent handbook on stock market wisdom, adding in the dedication 'Of all the books on finance, it's the most useful, the funniest and Schwed has but one fault, he prefers gin to Bordeaux'.
