= Louis Chauvel =

French sociologist

Louis Chauvel (born 2 November 1967) is a French sociologist, full professor at University of Luxembourg, PhD Université de Lille (1997), Habilitation Sciences Po (2003). He is specialized in social generations, in the analysis of social structures, in cohort and generational change. Chauvel received some international media attention as an expert following the spring 2006 First Employment Contract protests in France, which underlined the déclassement (downward social mobility) of the young generations in France. His analyses on the declining leadership of the "new" (post-1968) middle classes on the French political system explain the 2007 success of Nicolas Sarkozy. He develops a comparative theory of Welfare regime sustainability based on the age-period-cohort impact of economic stresses on social generations: Southern European countries, including France, prefer the development of seniority rights to the integration of the new generations. A "policy of generation" would be able to restore the long-term balance between age groups.

He has published seventy scientific papers on social change, social inequalities, middle class, generational change and suicide, he is also a proponent of public sociology. Member of the Institut universitaire de France, he is also member of the executive committee of the French Association Française de Sociologie and of the International Sociological Association, and had been the General Secretary of the European Sociological Association (2004–2006).

== Publications ==
- Le Destin des générations. Structure sociale et cohortes en France au XXe siècle, Presses universitaires de France, Paris, 1998, ISBN 2-13-052710-8
- Les Classes moyennes à la dérive, Seuil, Paris, ISBN 2-02-089244-8
