= École nationale supérieure de chimie de Lille =

Chemistry college in France

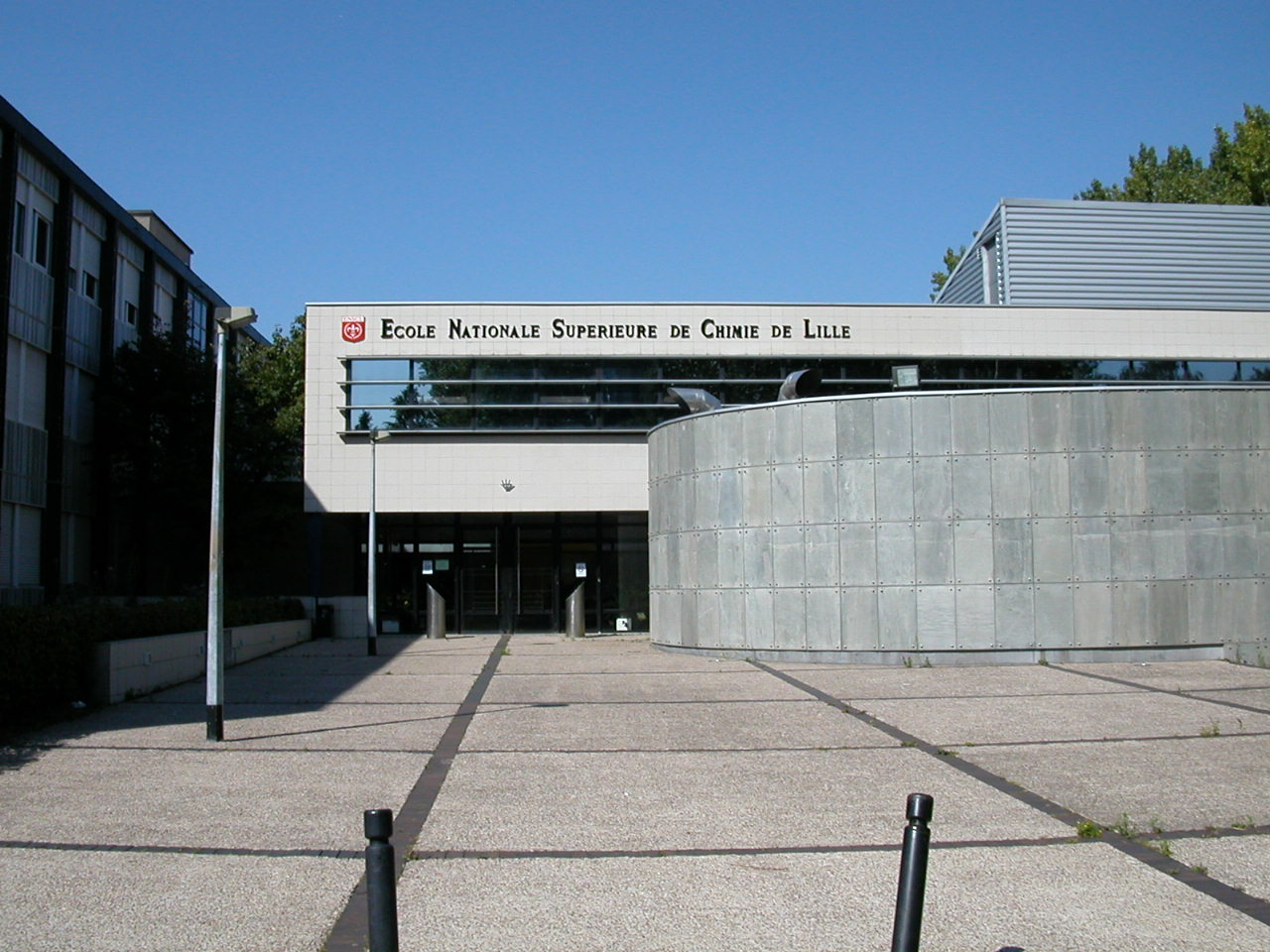
- Type: Public
- Established: 1894
- Affiliations: École centrale de Lille; Community of Universities and Institutions (COMUE) Lille Nord de France
- Location: Villeneuve-d'Ascq - European Metropolis of Lille, Hauts-de-France; 50°36′35″N 3°08′46″E
- Website: ensc-lille.fr

The École nationale supérieure de chimie de Lille (ENSCL or Chimie Lille) was founded in 1894 as the Institut de chimie de Lille. It is part of the Community of Universities and Institutions (COMUE) Lille Nord de France.

It is located on the science and technology campus of the University of Lille.

It delivers engineering and research curricula (masters and doctoral studies) in the following chemistry area :

- Sustainable Chemistry and processes for next generation chemistry,
- Formulation Chemistry,
- Materials science/metallurgy.

== Masters and Advanced Masters (MS) ==
Master's degrees are joint program curricula with University of Lille faculties and/or École centrale de Lille.

- Master's degree in Chemistry and Engineering Formulation - joint degree with University of Lille
- Master's degree in Organic and Macromolecular Chemistry
- Master's degree in Catalysis and Processes - joint program with École centrale de Lille.
- Master's degree in Advanced Materials - joint degree with University of Lille
- Master's degree in Engineering of the polymer systems - joint degree with University of Lille
- Master's degree in Chemistry, energy, environment - joint degree with University of Lille

== Doctoral studies and Research laboratories ==
Research is associated with the Institut des molécules et de la matière condensée de Lille of the Université Lille Nord de France (University of Lille) and is supported through the following laboratories :

- Unité de catalyse et de chimie du solide de Lille (UCCS UMR-CNRS 8181), jointly operated with University of Lille and École centrale de Lille;
- Laboratoire de structure et propriétés de l’état Solide LSPES UMR CNRS 8008 - PERF, jointly operated with University of Lille;
- Laboratoire de chimie organique et macromoléculaire UMR CNRS 8009 jointly operated with University of Lille;
- Laboratoire de métallurgie physique et génie des matériaux UMR CNRS 8517 jointly operated with University of Lille.
