= Hilis =

Hilis / Garakotuk Հիլիս / Qarakötük
- Qarakötük
- Location within Azerbaijan Location within Karabakh Economic Region
- Coordinates: 39°57′17″N 46°41′51″E
- Country: Azerbaijan
  - District: Khojaly
- Elevation: 909 m (2,982 ft)

Population (2015)
  - Total: 180
- Time zone: UTC+4 (AZT)

Hilis (Armenian: Հիլիս) or Garakotuk (Azerbaijani: Qarakötük, formerly İlis) is a village in the Khojaly District of Azerbaijan, in the region of Nagorno-Karabakh. Until 2023 it was controlled by the breakaway Republic of Artsakh. The village had an ethnic Armenian-majority population until the expulsion of the Armenian population of Nagorno-Karabakh by Azerbaijan following the 2023 Azerbaijani offensive in Nagorno-Karabakh.

== History ==
During the Soviet period, the village was a part of the Askeran District of the Nagorno-Karabakh Autonomous Oblast.

Hilis was a part of the Republic of Artsakh until its dissolution on 2024.

== Historical heritage sites ==
Historical heritage sites in and around the village include a village and cemetery from between the 16th and 18th centuries, St. John's Church (Armenian: Սուրբ Հովհաննես եկեղեցի, romanized: Surb Hovhannes Yekeghetsi) built in 1860, and a 19th-century spring monument.

== Economy and culture ==
The population is mainly engaged in agriculture and animal husbandry. As of 2015, the village has a municipal building, a house of culture, the Hilis branch of the Khndzristan Secondary School, and a medical centre.

== Demographics ==
The village had 172 inhabitants in 2005, and 180 inhabitants in 2015.
