= University of the Littoral Opal Coast =

Public university based in northern France

Coordinates: 50.9533°N 1.8795°E

- Université du Littoral Côte d'Opale
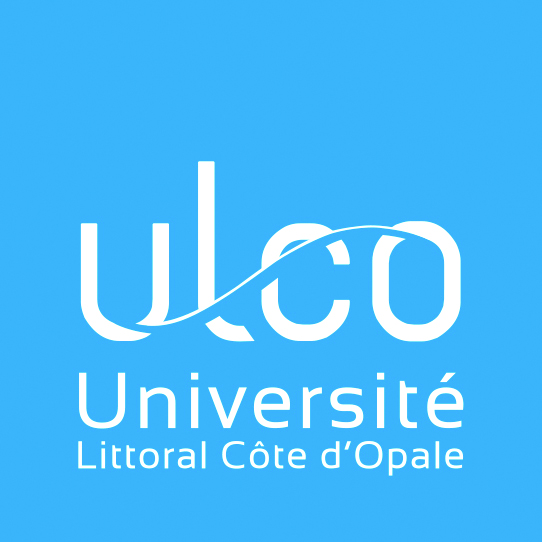
- Motto: Une université à dimension humaine. A university with a human dimension.
- Type: Public
- Established: 1991
- Budget: €95 million
- President: Hassane Sadok
- Academic staff: 1,037 including 534 professors, 503 personnel
- Students: 10,406
- Location: Boulogne-sur-Mer; Calais; Dunkirk; Saint-Omer, Hauts-de-France, France
- Campus: Urban (Boulogne-sur-Mer, Calais, Dunkirk), small town (Saint-Omer)
- Affiliations: AUF, COMUE Lille Nord de France, EUA
- Website: univ-littoral.fr

The University of the Littoral Opal Coast (French: Université du Littoral Côte d'Opale; ULCO) is a public university located in the Nord and Pas-de-Calais departments of northern France. Its namesake is the Opal Coast region, of which it is a part.

The university is situated on 4 main campuses in the towns of Boulogne-sur-Mer, Calais, Dunkirk, and Saint-Omer.

ULCO forms part of the University of Lille Nord de France university group.

== Foundation ==
The University of the Littoral Opal Coast was established in 1991 after a reorganisation of public universities in the Academy of Lille. In 2009, the university became a founding member of the Lille Nord de France university group. Since 2016, it has had an alliance with the University of Artois and the University of Picardy Jules Verne.

== Teaching and research ==
ULCO offers bachelors, vocational bachelors, masters, and doctoral degrees in business, economics, engineering, education, history, languages, law, literature, mathematics, life sciences, natural sciences, social sciences, and technology, as well as BUT and DEUST certifications.

The university conducts substantial research in relation to environmental protection, sustainable development, the Opal Coast, and coastal environments. There is also research activity related to human and social sciences, technology, and health.

ULCO houses a language resource centre on the Boulogne-sur-Mer, Calais, and Dunkirk campuses for students to study modern languages and earn CLES certifications in them.

International students, who represent 75 different nationalities, comprise 11 percent of the student body.

== Campus ==
The University of the Littoral Opal Coast is situated on 4 main campuses, referred to by the university as teaching sites, in Boulogne-sur-Mer, Calais, Dunkirk, and Saint-Omer.

All teaching sites have a dining hall and library. Boulogne and Calais also feature student unions, while Calais, Dunkirk, and Saint-Omer all have gymnasiums.

== Notable alumni ==
- Yann Capet, politician
- Éric Pichet, economist

== See also ==
- Université Lille Nord de France
- European Doctoral College Lille Nord-Pas de Calais
- Ifremer
