= Institut Lillois d'Ingénierie de la Santé =

University of Lille faculty

Faculty of Engineering and Health Management (ILIS)
- Faculty of Engineering and Health Management (ILIS)
- Former names: IUP ILIS, Institut Lillois d'Ingénierie de la Santé
- Type: Public
- Established: 1992 (Lille)
- Academic affiliations: University of Lille
- Students: 1000
- Undergraduates: 650
- Postgraduates: 350
- Doctoral students: 2
- Location: Lille, France; 50°36′25.20″N 3°8′20.40″E
- Campus: Loos, Lille
- Website: ilis.univ-lille2.fr

The Faculty of Engineering and Health Management (ILIS) also Institut Lillois d'Ingénierie de la Santé is part of the University of Lille. It is allowed to deliver bachelor's and master's degrees in Health Sciences. The ILIS lays a special emphasis on students acquiring a broad range of professional skills and work experience during their years of study and before graduating. In essence quite close to the German model of University of Applied Sciences or Fachhochschule, the institute is keen to let its students accumulate work experience so as to allow them a chance to compete with engineer and business schools on the job market. The core curriculum focus on current healthcare issues such as elderly care, hospital quality management, nutrition, environment, clinical research and sales of drugs and medical devices.

== History ==
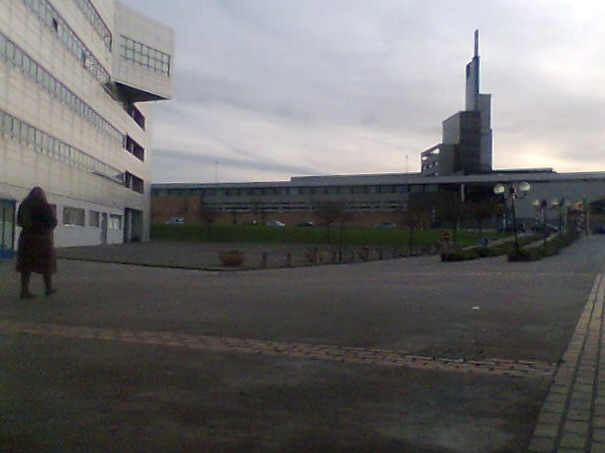
View from Jeanne de Flandres Hospital, ILIS is behind the medical school tower

ILIS Founded was found in 1992 and graduated its first class in 1995. Change of location and set up behind the Faculty of Medicine in 2002. A building extension was made in 2009. It was recognised as a fully fledged faculty in 2010.

At first, the ILIS was set up to provide for an unmet need from the healthcare sector. During the early 1990s, more stringent rules and regulations were enforced in the healthcare sector. Firms were also having difficulties recruiting employees having both a health and management background. Therefore, a new curriculum was set up focusing on quality assurance, management and audits. Progressively, the ILIS diversified and extender its programs to biomedical technology sales and marketing as well as safety and environmental concerns. ILIS graduates are mostly employed in positions that did not exist or were not well known before 1990 such as Health Quality Assurance Officer, Risk Manager, Application Specialist and Data Manager. The ILIS graduates have one of the highest employment rate of the Lille University, with 80% of the students already hired at graduation.

== Campus Santé ==
The ILIS is located on the town of Loos in the suburb of Lille. It is near the CHU Lille University Hospital, and the Faculties of Medicine, Pharmacy, and Dental Surgery. It benefits from the Eurasanté Health & Biology competitive hub with firms like Bayer and Diagast.

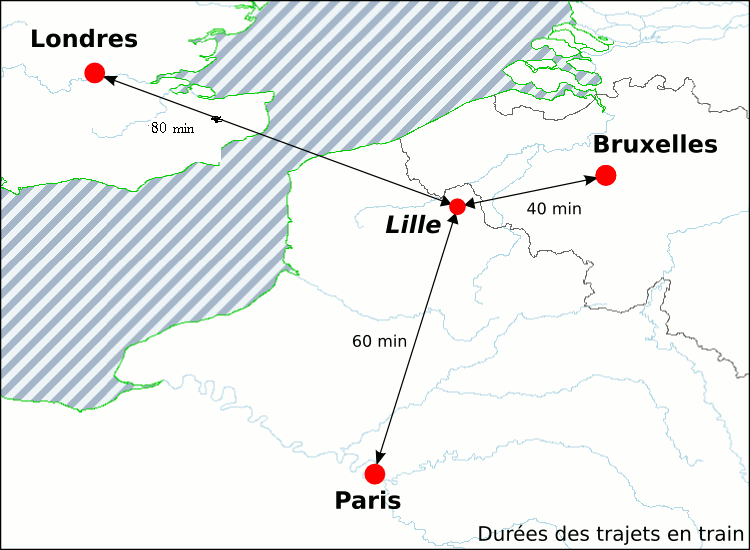
ILIS (France) - location in Europe

== Admission ==
Student intake occurs at every level, provided the necessary prerequisites have been met. Freshmen often enter the school after a scientific Baccalauréat or after the PACES competitive exams to enter medical school or other health faculties. At the end of the first year, students are interviewed to check their commitment to this particular program as well as their will to choose a clear career path. Sophomores are expected to have at least some months of work experience in any business. Every new student will at some time of his curriculum, usually at the beginning, pass this admission interview to receive clearance to continue their studies at the ILIS.

== Programmes ==
The first two years, a sound scientific background is required from students if they are to succeed. During their graduation year, they will concentrate on quality management and audits. The fourth and fifth year is more marketing and management oriented, with teamwork becoming even more important. The placements, the duration of which increases each year, allow students to integrate the reality of the working world progressively: 2 x 6 weeks full-time in the second year, 2 x 2 months full-time in the third year and 5 and 6 months full-time in the fourth and fifth year respectively.

The objectives of these placements have been clearly defined :

- Development of direct relationships with industry and the working world
- Involvement and accountability of students, leading to real autonomy and competence thanks to analytic tools, synthetic techniques, capacity to draw up and carry out a plan of action or a project from A to Z.

=== BSc programmes ===
- Bsc Public Health and Health Engineering
- Bsc(Honours) Health Sciences

=== MSc programmes ===
Msc. Health Sciences but as a professional degree akin to the Master of Health Administration with some sections closely equivalent to Master of Public Health

== Research ==
Faculty members form part of research teams.

== Accreditations and certifications ==
ILIS is accredited by the French Ministry of Education and uses the ECTS European grading system.

== See also ==
- University of Lille
- University of Applied Sciences
- Vocational University
- Allied health professions
