= Utrecht Network =

Network of European universities

- Formation: 1987
- Type: Higher Education
- Headquarters: University of Bologna
- Region served: Europe and global partners
- President: Kristin Skogedal
- Vice President: Sabine Pendl
- Website: utrecht-network.org

The Utrecht Network is a network of European universities. Founded in 1987, the network promotes the internationalisation of tertiary education through summer schools, student and staff exchanges and joint degrees. It is operated by the University of Bologna in Italy.

== Member universities ==
Austria

- University of Graz

Belgium

- University of Antwerp

Czech Republic

- Masaryk University

Denmark

- University of Aarhus

Estonia

- University of Tartu

Finland

- University of Helsinki

France

- University of Lille
- University of Strasbourg

Germany

- Ruhr University Bochum
- Leipzig University

Greece

- Aristotle University of Thessaloniki

Hungary

- Eötvös Loránd University

Ireland

- University College Cork

Italy

- University of Bologna

Latvia

- University of Latvia

Lithuania

- Vilnius University

Malta

- University of Malta

Netherlands

- Utrecht School of the Arts
- Utrecht University

Norway

- University of Bergen

Poland

- Jagiellonian University

Portugal

- University of Coimbra

Romania

- Alexandru Ioan Cuza University of Iaşi

Slovakia

- Comenius University in Bratislava

Slovenia

- University of Ljubljana

Spain

- Complutense University of Madrid
- University of Valencia

Sweden

- University of Lund

Switzerland

- University of Basel

Turkey

- Boğaziçi University

Ukraine

- University of Kyiv

United Kingdom

- Queen's University Belfast
- University of Hull

=== Former members ===
Iceland

- University of Iceland

== Overseas partners ==
This is a list of universities that form Global Partner Networks of the Utrecht Network.

=== Australian-European Network (AEN) ===
Australia

- Edith Cowan University
- Griffith University
- University of Tasmania
- University of Wollongong
- Western Sydney University

=== Mid-America Universities International (MAUI) ===
United States of America

- Baylor University
- Columbia College Chicago
- Doane University
- Kansas State University
- Missouri University of Science & Technology
- Oklahoma State University
- Southern Illinois University Carbondale
- Texas State University – San Marcos
- Texas Tech University
- University of Kansas
- University of Missouri – Kansas City
- University of Missouri – St Louis
- University of Nebraska at Kearney
- University of Nebraska at Lincoln
- University of Nebraska at Omaha
- University of Oklahoma
- University of Tulsa
- West Virginia University
- Wichita State University
