= Charles de Gaulle University – Lille III =

University in Hauts-de-France, France

Coordinates: 50°37′40″N 3°07′35″E

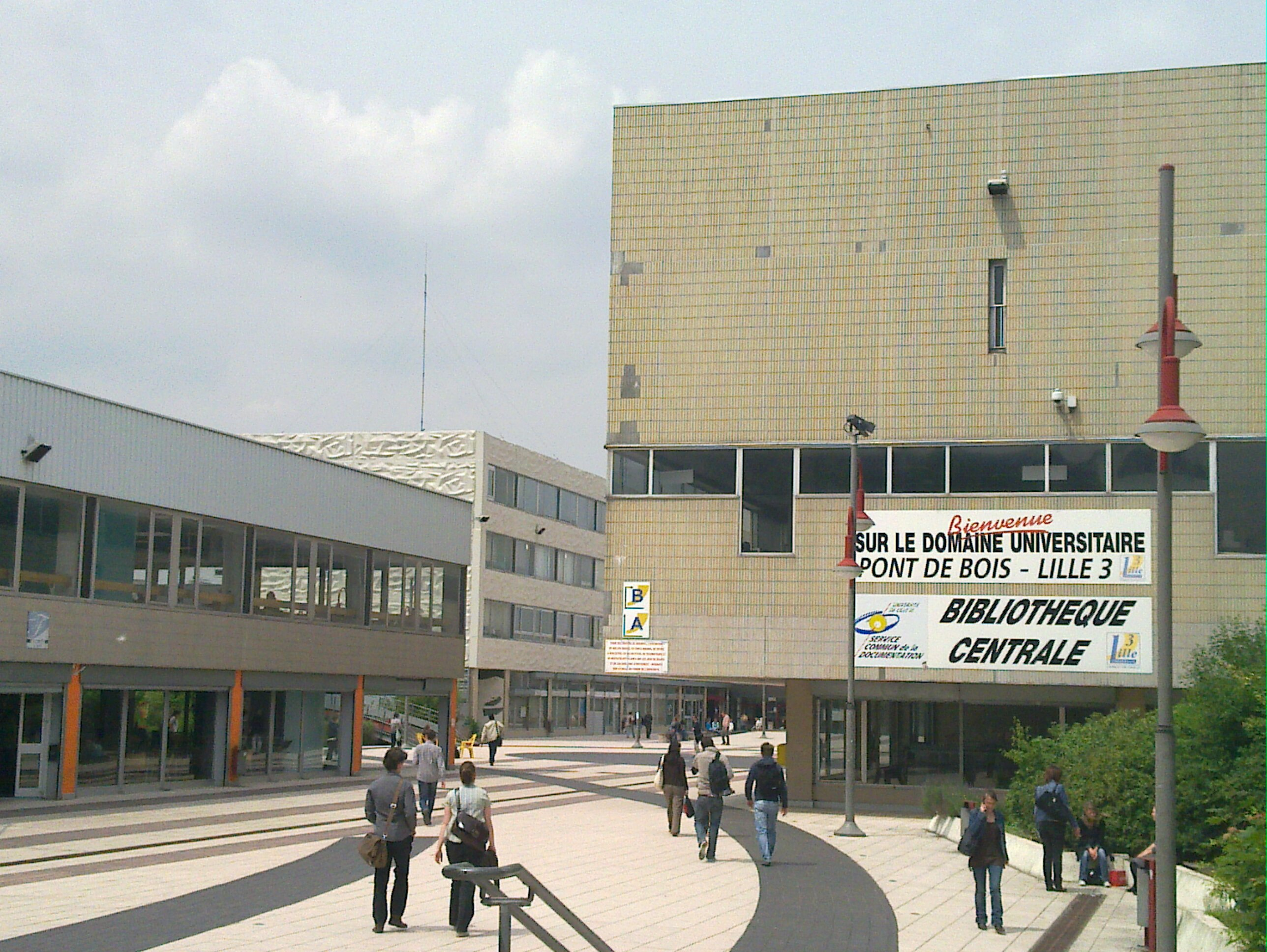
Entrance of Lille III

The Charles de Gaulle University – Lille III (French: Université Lille 3 Charles-de-Gaulle) was a French university. Since 1974, the main campus of University of Lille III was located in Villeneuve d'Ascq in eastern Lille, at Pont de Bois metro station, and includes 21,000 students.

The University of Lille III continues the long tradition of teaching the humanities in the area around Lille, which originates from the Université de Douai, established in 1559, and located 25 km away from the present modern campus. The university of Lille III even has an independent cinema named "Kino" (Cinema in German). Since 1970, science and technology have been taught at an independent campus of Université de Lille I - USTL, while the faculties of law, management, sports and health are part of the independent campus of Université de Lille II. Together, the universities of Lille include more than 90,000 students and 3,000 PhD students, supported by the universities' research laboratories.

At the beginning of 2018, the three universities of Lille (Lille 1, Lille 2, Lille 3) merged to form the University of Lille.

== Association Ulysse ==
Association Ulysse, or Club Ulysse as it is also known, is a non-academic extracurricular club targeted specifically at international students studying at Lille III. The club's goal is to connect Study Abroad students with native French students in order to ease their transition into Lille III and to create an opportunity of cross-cultural exchange. Through Association Ulysse, foreign students can sign up for a French partner who can act as a guide to the university and the city. The main attraction of the club is the many day trips that it offers, including trips to Bruges, Amsterdam, London, and many more surrounding European cities. There is also Cafe Ulysse where students can gather, get food, and listen to music between classes.

== See also ==
- Lille Stesichorus
