= University of Lille Doctoral College =

The University of Lille Doctoral College, formerly the European Doctoral College Lille Nord-de-France, is part of the University of Lille since the dissolution of the Community of Universities and Institutions Lille Nord de France in 2019.

It is a European research centre supporting academic and industrial research institutions in the north of France (Lille - Hauts-de-France). Associated with it are six doctoral schools in the region, for 3,000 registered PhD students in 139 research labs. The University of Lille is the main member.

== From doctoral research to innovation applications ==
The European Doctoral College of the University of Lille is a hub for doctoral researchers and contributes to the Lisbon strategy to make Europe 'the most competitive and knowledge-based economy in the world and a reference for high quality and excellence in education'. The doctoral college groups together six doctoral schools supported by research laboratories in Lille-Kortrijk Eurodistrict and related universities in the Euroregion that includes Belgium and the French Nord - Pas de Calais region. It aims to strengthen academic and research cooperation among the universities in the Euroregion.

The purpose of the doctoral college is to contribute to and sustain a combination of first-class university institutes and close links between education, research and society in the Lille-Nord de France region, a European region including over a hundred thousand university students and more than ten thousand researchers. Lille-Nord de France claims to be one of the few European hub regions recognised for their academic excellence and innovation.

Research domains are supported by several hundred Master/research curricula from the Community of Universities and Institutions (COMUE) Lille Nord de France and partner institutes, as the first step towards doctoral studies within the doctoral college. The college supports both fundamental and applied research, and participates in several "competitiveness clusters" (pôles de compétitivité) located in the Nord de France region with strong links to industry applications. Incubators for start-up companies (such as Eurasanté and MITI-incubation) are located on the campus sites in the Lille area.

Most researchers at the doctoral college are partially funded through grants from the French National Centre for Scientific Research (CNRS) or from the French Agence nationale pour la Recherche (ANR). Applied research is also funded through university-industry joint programmes (CIFRE).

It is at the origin of the I-Site (Initiatives for Science-Innovation-Territories-Economy) « Université Lille Nord-Europe (ULNE) » which aims to classify it in the top 50 universities of Europe.

== Members and partners ==
French research teams associated to the European Doctoral College are hosted in the following academic institutes listed in the Académie de Lille:

The Community of Universities and Institutions (COMUE) Lille Nord de France includes the following establishments:

- University of Lille (the main component)
- Artois University
- University of the Littoral Opal Coast
- University of Valenciennes and Hainaut-Cambresis
- École des Mines-Télécom de Lille-Douai (IMT)
- École centrale de Lille
- Lille Catholic University
- Centre national de la recherche scientifique (CNRS)
- French Institute for Research in Computer Science and Automation (INRIA)

Several institutions are associate members:

- Skema Business School
- CHU Lille University Hospital
- Institut national de la santé et de la recherche médicale (Inserm)
- École nationale supérieure des arts et industries textiles (ENSAIT)
- École nationale supérieure d'architecture et de paysage de Lille (ENSAPL)
- Arts et Métiers ParisTech (Lille Campus)
- École nationale supérieure de chimie de Lille (ENSCL)
- École supérieure d'art Dunkerque-Tourcoing (ESA)
- École supérieure de journalisme de Lille (ESJ Lille)
- Institut national de la recherche agronomique (INRA)
- Institut d'études politiques de Lille (Sciences Po Lille)
- Institut national de recherche sur les transports et leur sécurité (IFSTTAR)
- Institut Pasteur de Lille
- Institut français de recherche pour l'exploitation de la mer (IFREMER)
- Institut national de recherche sur les transports et leur sécurité (INRETS)
- Office national d'études et de recherches aérospatiales-Institut de mécanique des fluides de Lille (ONERA)
- Belgian universities and their research teams

It participates in French competitiveness clusters:

- Pôle de compétitivité Industrie du commerce (PICOM)
- Pôle de compétitivité Industrie des transports (i-TRANS)
- Pôle de compétitivité Maîtrise énergétique des entraînements électriques (MEDEE)
- Pôle de compétitivité Aquimer
- Pôle de compétitivité Matériaux et Applications pour une Utilisation Durable (MAUD)
- Pôle de compétitivité Nutrition Santé Longévité (NSL) (Eurasanté)
- Pôle de compétitivité Technologies de l’Environnement Appliquées au Matières et aux Matériaux (TEAM2)
- Pôle de compétitivité Textiles innovants (UP-TEX)

== Doctoral schools attached to the European doctoral college ==
Six doctoral schools are included in the European Doctoral College with 3,000 registered PhD students in 139 research labs:

- SPI - Doctoral School of Engineering Sciences supported by 22 research labs. The 22 research laboratories provide for fundamental and applied researches and contribute to engineering innovations. SPI doctoral school specialises in the following disciplines: mathematics, information technologies, control sciences, electrical engineering and electronics, nanotechnologies, mechanics and system design
- SMRE - Doctoral School for Science of Matter, Radiation, Environment supported by 26 research labs. SMRE doctoral school specialises in the following disciplines: physics, chemistry, earth science, ecology and environment, palaeontology, biological oceanology, and biotechnologies.
- BSL - Doctoral School Biology - Health supported by 47 research labs. Bio-Health (BSL) doctoral school specialises in the following disciplines: biology and life sciences, genomics, medicine, health.
- SESAM - Doctoral School in Business, economics, urban planning and management supported by 11 research labs. This doctoral school specialises in the following disciplines: economics, management sciences, sociology, anthropology, ethnology, prehistory, geography, urban planning and landscape.
- SHS - Doctoral School in Social Sciences and Humanities supported by 19 research labs. The doctoral school for social sciences and humanities (SHS) specialises in the following disciplines: Philosophy, Linguistics, the Arts, Space/Time, Languages, Literature, Civilisations, Texts and Cultures, Psychology, Cognition, Modelling, Mediations in Knowledge and Societies.
- SJPG - Doctoral School for Law, Administration, Political Science supported by 14 research labs. The doctoral school specialises in the following disciplines: law, management science (finance and marketing) and political science.

== Related associations ==
- University of Lille
- Pole universitaire Lille Nord Pas de Calais - News
- Bernard Gregory doctoral association
- Campus France
- Student grants programme
