= University of Lille Nord de France =

French higher education group from 2009 to 2019

Community of Universities and Institutions (COMUE) Lille Nord de France
- Community of Universities and Institutions (COMUE) Lille Nord de France
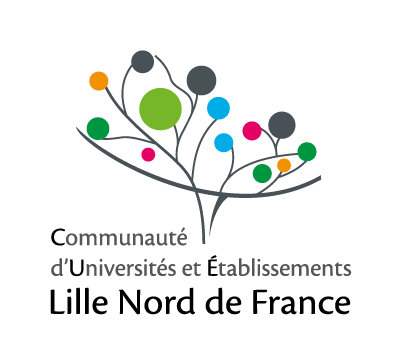
- Type: Public
- Active: 2009–2019
- Affiliations: CURIF; Utrecht Network; IMCC; EUA
- President: Mohamed Ourak
- Faculty: 4,600
- Administrative staff: 3200
- Students: 115,000
- Postgraduates: 12,600
- Doctoral students: 3,000
- Location: Lille, North, France
- Campus: European Metropolis of Lille, Hauts-de-France
- Website: www.cue-lillenorddefrance.fr

The Community of Universities and Institutions (COMUE) Lille Nord de France (formerly Université Lille Nord de France) was a French Groups of Universities and Institutions (COMUE) spread over multiple campuses and centered in Lille (North - Hauts-de-France). It included a European Doctoral College and federated universities, engineering schools and research centers. With more than one hundred thousand students, it was one of the largest university federations in France. The University of Lille, with nearly 70,000 students, was its main component. The COMUE stopped its activity in 2019 and its activities were transferred to its founding institutions.

== History ==
Founded as University of Douai in 1562, the university was renamed Université impériale de Douai-Lille in 1808, then as Université de Lille with faculty expansion in the Lille region from mid-19th century onwards.

- The roots of the faculties in law and humanities date back from the 16th century;
- The school of medicine and university hospital expanded rapidly from end-18th century;
- Research and education in mechanical engineering and chemistry expanded from the early 19th century;
- The faculty of sciences was set up in 1854 by bringing together different university-grade schools in Lille city centre;
- Research and education in control sciences and information technologies were set up in 1957;
- Research in fundamental physics, micro-electronics, molecular engineering and bio-technologies started in the 1980s.

The university expanded into several campuses and formed several universities/institutions in Lille region and North at the end of the 20th century.

Finally the universities and institutions came together as the Université Lille Nord de France; and after as the Community of Universities and Institutions (COMUE) Lille Nord de France.

== Members ==
The Community of Universities and Institutions (COMUE) Lille Nord de France included the following establishments :

- University of Lille (the main component)
- University of Artois
- University of the Littoral Opal Coast
- University of Valenciennes and Hainaut-Cambresis
- École des Mines-Télécom de Lille-Douai (IMT)
- École centrale de Lille
- Lille Catholic University
- Centre national de la recherche scientifique (CNRS)
- French Institute for Research in Computer Science and Automation (INRIA)

Several institutions were associate members :

- Skema Business School
- CHU Lille University Hospital
- Institut national de la santé et de la recherche médicale (Inserm)
- École nationale supérieure des arts et industries textiles (ENSAIT)
- Arts et Métiers ParisTech (Lille Campus)
- École nationale supérieure d'architecture et de paysage de Lille (ENSAPL)
- École nationale supérieure de chimie de Lille (ENSCL)
- École supérieure d'art Dunkerque-Tourcoing (ESA)
- École supérieure de journalisme de Lille (ESJ Lille)
- Institut d'études politiques de Lille (Sciences Po Lille)
- Institut national de recherche sur les transports et leur sécurité (IFSTTAR)
- Institut Pasteur de Lille
- Institut national de la recherche agronomique (INRA)
- Institut français de recherche pour l'exploitation de la mer (IFREMER)
- Institut national de recherche sur les transports et leur sécurité (INRETS)
- Office national d'études et de recherches aérospatiales-Institut de mécanique des fluides de Lille (ONERA)
- Belgian universities and their research teams

It participated in French competitiveness clusters :

- Pôle de compétitivité Industrie du commerce (PICOM)
- Pôle de compétitivité Industrie des transports (i-TRANS)
- Pôle de compétitivité Maîtrise énergétique des entraînements électriques (MEDEE)
- Pôle de compétitivité Aquimer
- Pôle de compétitivité Matériaux et Applications pour une Utilisation Durable (MAUD)
- Pôle de compétitivité Nutrition Santé Longévité (NSL) (Eurasanté)
- Pôle de compétitivité Technologies de l’Environnement Appliquées au Matières et aux Matériaux (TEAM2)
- Pôle de compétitivité Textiles innovants (UP-TEX)

== Doctoral school and research laboratories ==
139 research labs and institutes were associated to the European Doctoral College Lille Nord-de-France. Six doctoral schools were included with 3,000 registered PhD students.

Altogether, the university research labs owned an active portfolio of more than 170 invention patent families. (Approximately 411 results found for Univ Lille in the EPO worldwide patent database in mid-2008)

- SPI - Doctoral School of Engineering Sciences, supported by 22 research labs.
- SMRE - Doctoral School for Science of Matter, Radiation, Environment, supported by 26 research labs.
- BSL - Doctoral School Biology - Health, supported by 47 research labs.
- SESAM - Doctoral School in Business, economics, urban planning and management, supported by 11 research labs.
- SHS - Doctoral School in Social Sciences and Humanities, supported by 19 research labs.
- SJPG - Doctoral School for Law, Administration, Political Science, supported by 14 research labs.
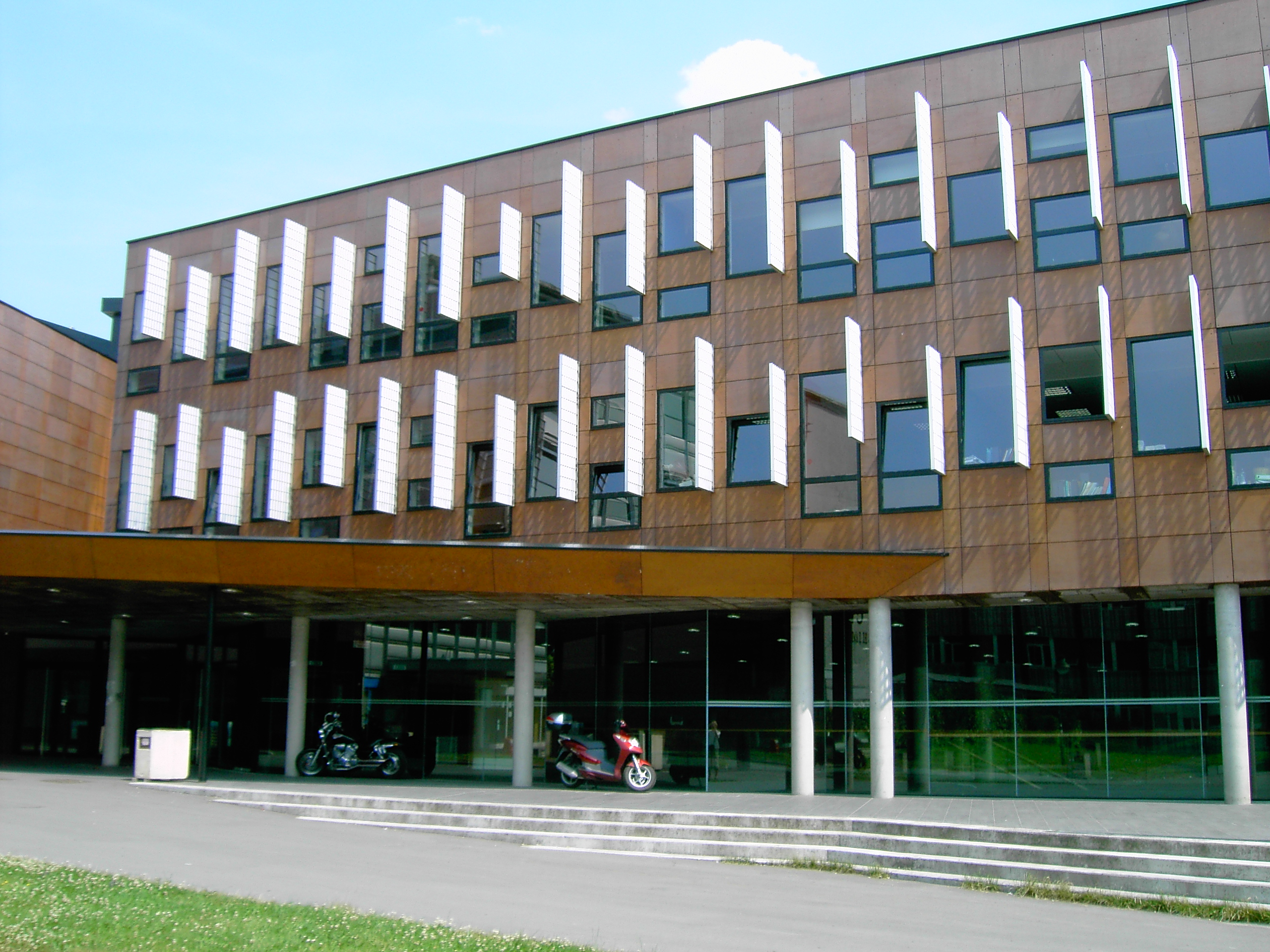

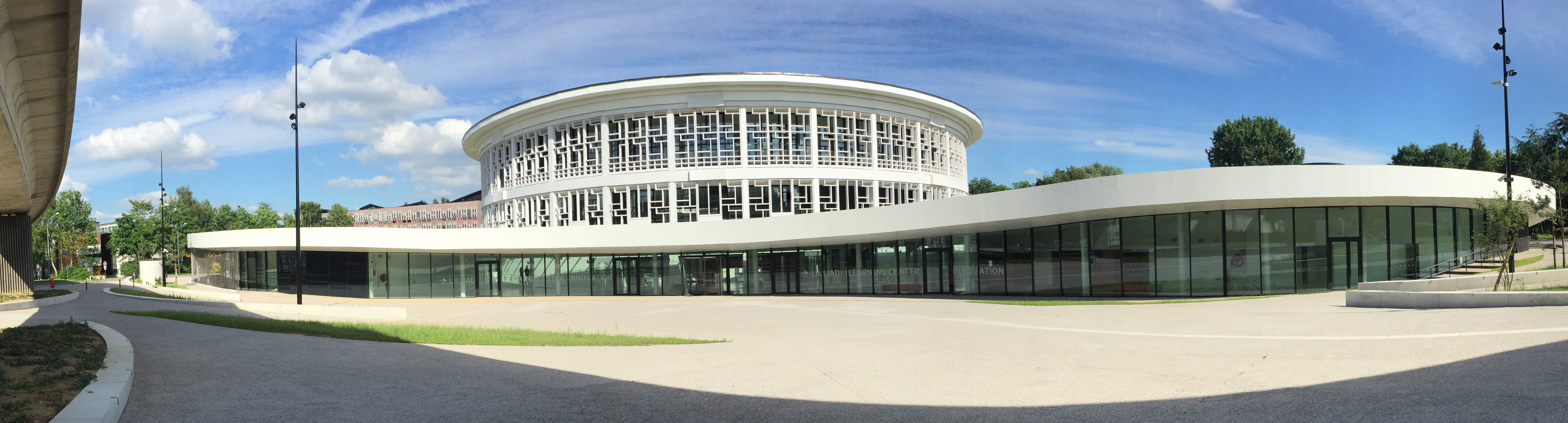
Lilliad Learning Center Innovation - Library

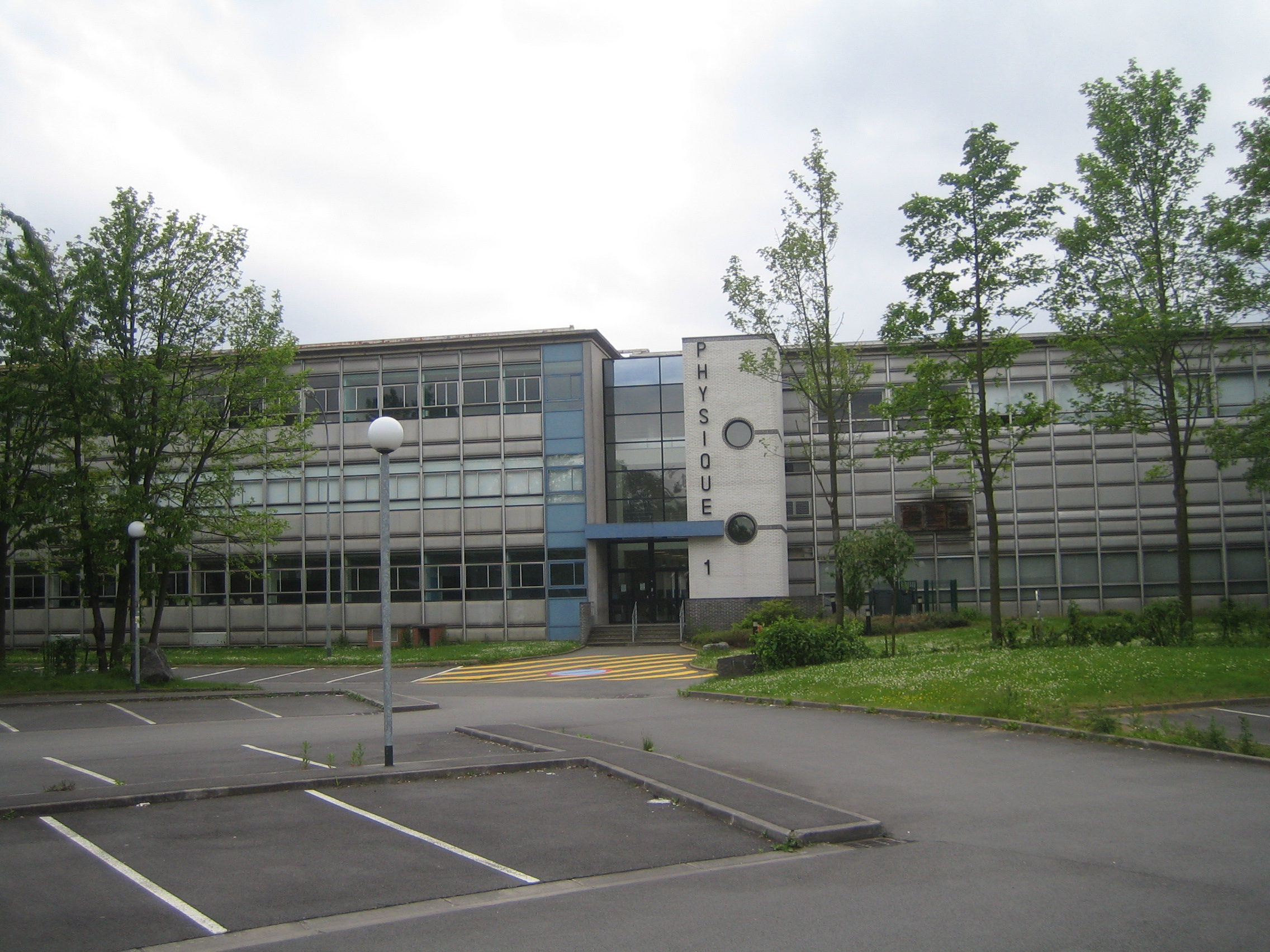

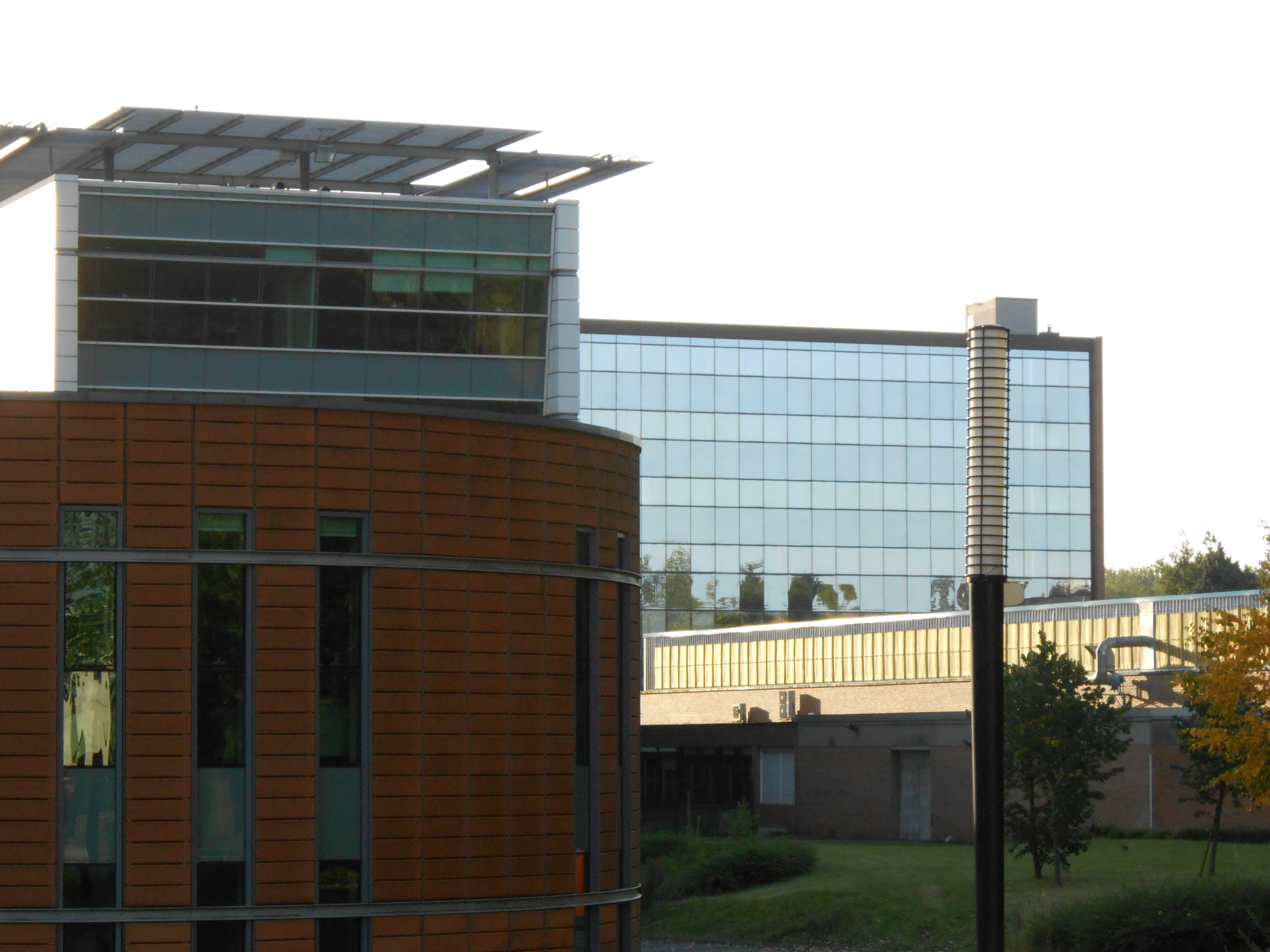

== Notable alumni and faculty ==
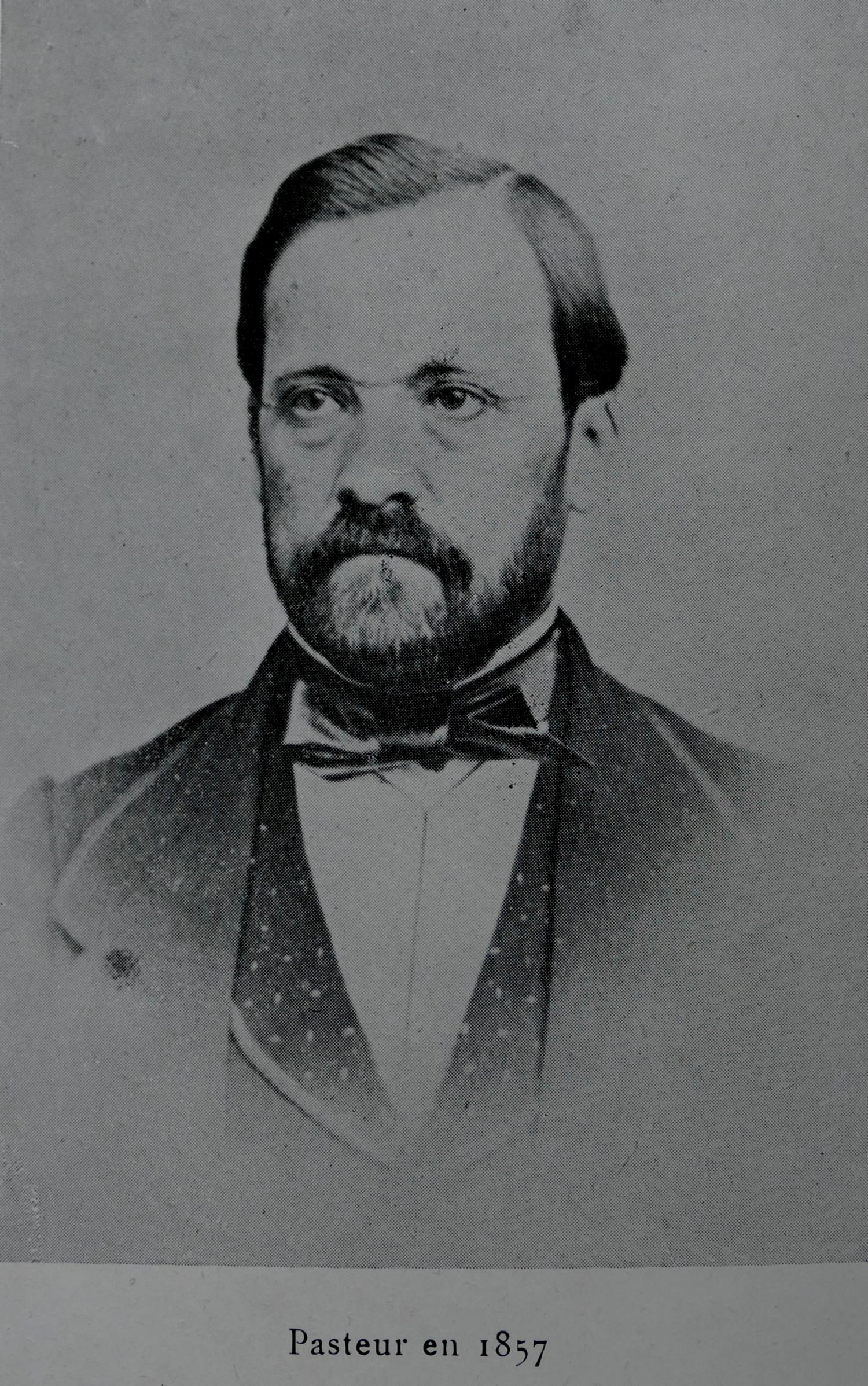
Louis Pasteur

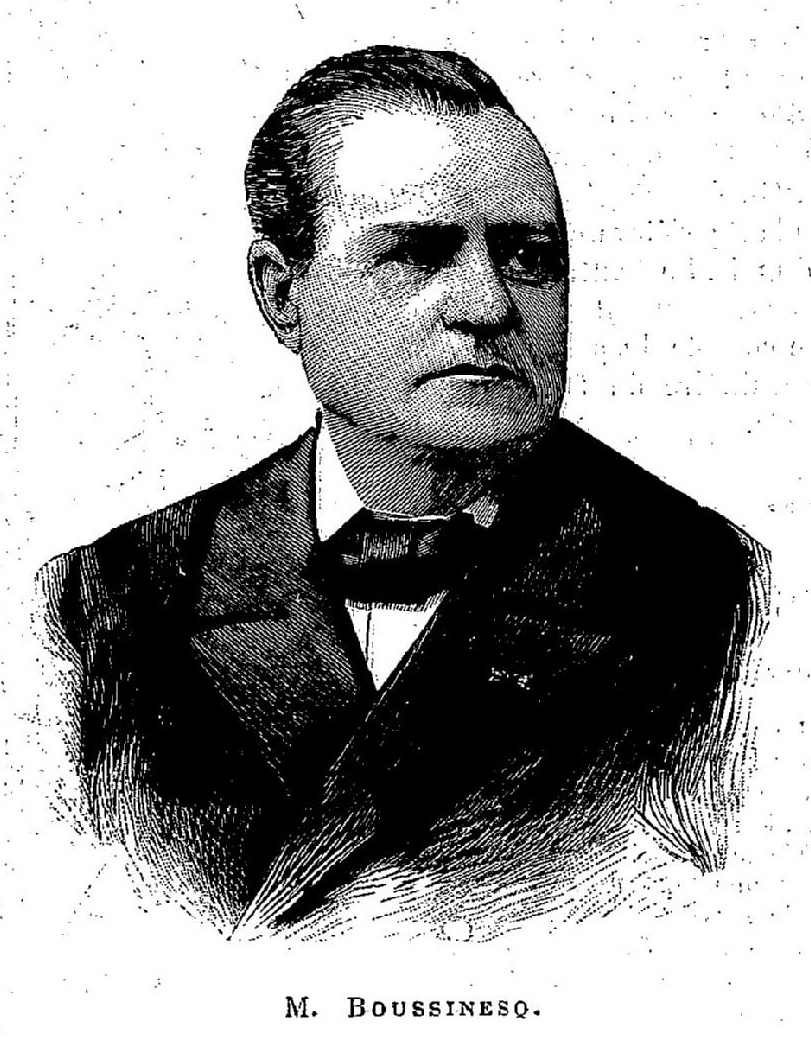
Joseph Valentin Boussinesq

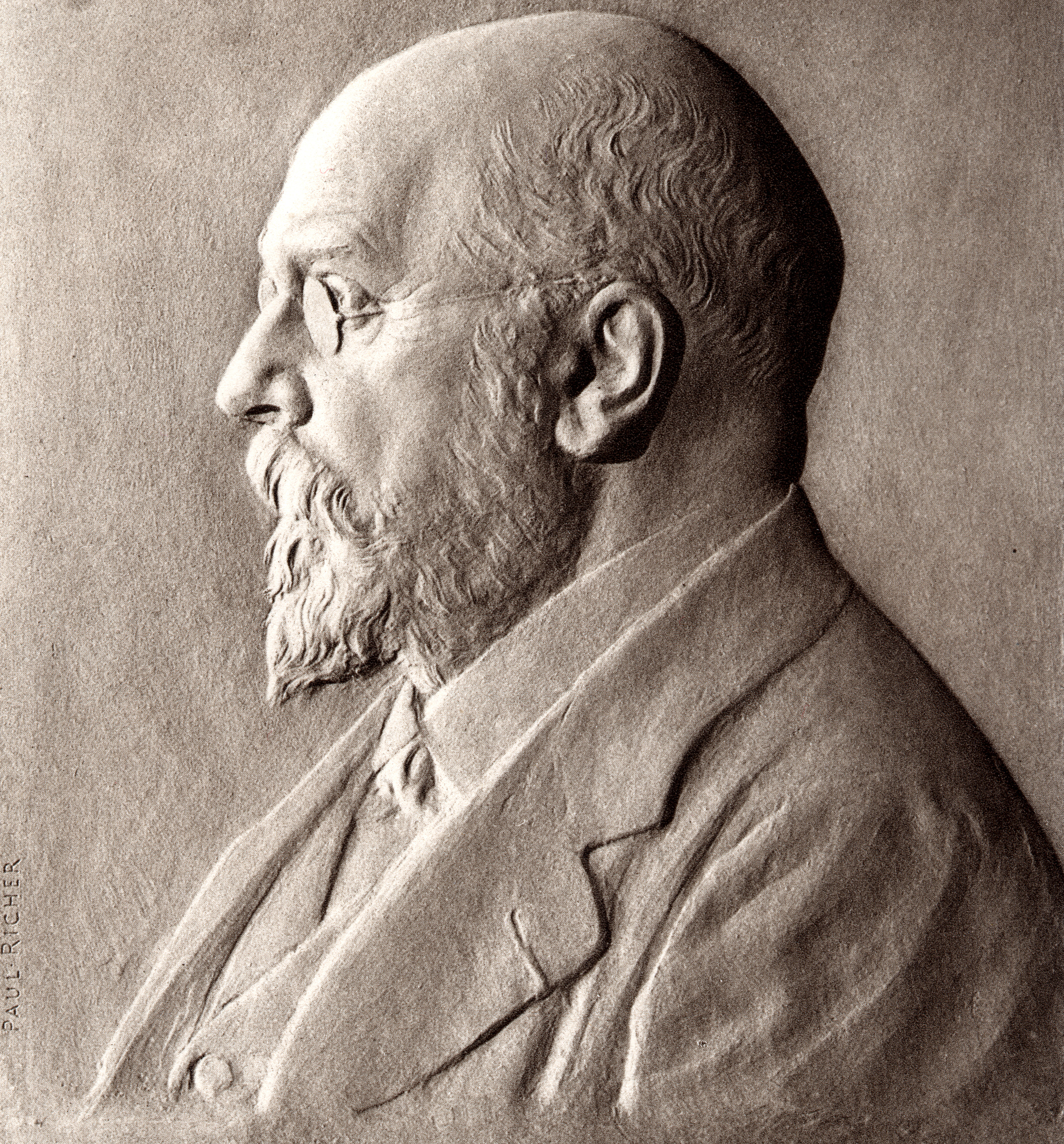
Alfred Mathieu Giard

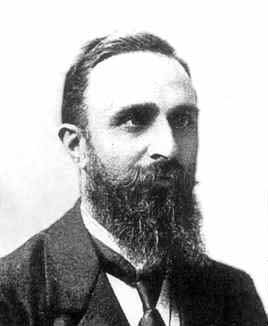
Henri Padé

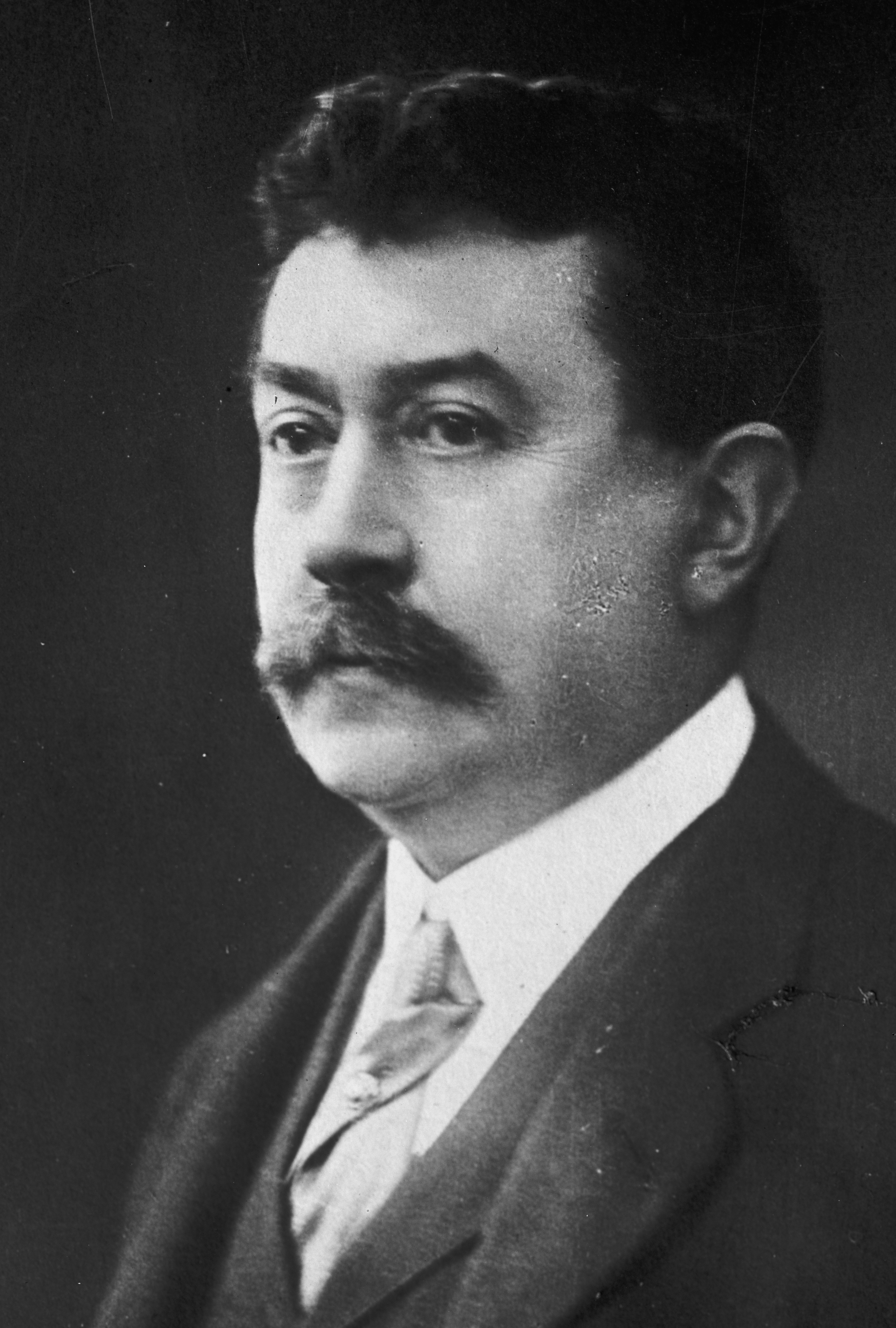
Paul Painlevé
- Mathematics, engineering and information theory : Émile Borel, Joseph Boussinesq, Henri Cartan, Albert Châtelet, Paul Dubreil, Joseph Kampé de Fériet, Szolem Mandelbrojt, Benoît Mandelbrot, Mohammad Ali Mojtahedi, Henri Padé, Paul Painlevé, Faustin-Archange Touadéra, Ernest Vessiot
- Biology, chemistry, geology and medicine : Charles Barrois, Albert Calmette, Jean Théodore Delacour, Alfred Mathieu Giard, Camille Guérin, Claude Auguste Lamy, Louis Pasteur
- Law : René Cassin (Nobel Prize)
- Literature and human sciences : Pierre Bourdieu, Henri Gouhier, Étienne Gilson, Victor Henry, Pierre Macherey, Vladimir Jankélévitch.

== Student and researcher mobility ==
University institutes and research labs promote student and researchers mobility and cooperate in several university networks :

- ESDP
- Utrecht Network
- IMCC
- Compostela Group of Universities
- Mobility centre
