= Nay =

Nay or NAY may refer to:

- Nay (name)
- Ney (also nay, nye, nai), a wind instrument
- Nay, Manche, a place in the Manche département of France
- Nay, Pyrénées-Atlantiques, a place in the Pyrénées-Atlantiques département of France
- Nay-ye Olya, a village in Khuzestan Province, Iran
- Nay-ye Sofla, a village in Khuzestan Province, Iran
- Nay, Iran, a village in Razavi Khorasan Province, Iran
- Kalateh-ye Nay, a village in Razavi Khorasan Province, Iran
- Ernst Wilhelm Nay, German abstract painter
- an abbreviation for the Mexican state Nayarit
- Beijing Nanyuan Airport, China; IATA airport code NAY
- Newton Aycliffe railway station, England; National Rail station code NAY
- An archaic form of no, used mainly in oral voting, and the opposite of yea

== See also ==
- Nai (disambiguation)
- Ney (disambiguation)
- Neigh (disambiguation)
