= Nei =

Nei or NEI may refer to:

- Nei, Iran, a village in Ardabil Province, Iran
- Nei, a character in the Phantasy Star II roleplaying game
- Nutrition and Education International
- Nuclear Energy Institute, American nuclear industry lobbying group
- National Eye Institute, one of the US Institutes of Health
- Netherlands East-Indies, also known as the Dutch East Indies
- Northern Engineering Industries, a defunct British engineering firm
- Noise-equivalent irradiance, in astronomy

== People with the name Nei ==
- Iivo Nei (1931–2026), Estonian chess champion
- Masatoshi Nei (1931–2023), Japanese population geneticist
- Mati Nei (born 1942), Estonian chess champion
- Nei Kato, Japanese engineer
- Nei (footballer, born 1949), born Elias Ferreira Sobrinho, Brazilian football forward
- Nei (footballer, born 1971), born Valdinei Cunha, Brazilian football goalkeeper
- Nei (footballer, born 1980), born Claudinei Alexandre Aparecido, Brazilian football striker
- Nei (footballer, born 1985), born Claudinei Cardoso Félix Silva, Brazilian football right-back
- Nei (footballer, born 1991), born Jozinei João Machado Rodriguez, Brazilian football attacking midfielder
- Ponto Nei, Japanese VTuber affiliated with Nijisanji

== See also ==
- Nai (disambiguation)
- Neigh (disambiguation)
- Neigong
- Ney (disambiguation)
- Nie (disambiguation)
- Nye (disambiguation)
