= Nai =

Nai or NAI may refer to:

== Music ==
- Nai (album), an album by singer Anna Vissi
- Nai (pan flute), a wind instrument, also known as a pan flute (Romania and Moldova)
- "Nai" (song), a 2007 CD single by Irini Merkouri

== Organizations ==
- NASA Astrobiology Institute, an organization supporting research of life in the universe
- National Academy of Inventors, a US non-profit organization dedicated to encouraging inventors in academia
- National Amusements, Inc, a privately owned media and entertainment company
- National Association for Interpretation, a professional organization of interpreters
- Natural Alternatives International, the company which manufactures the nutritional supplement Juice Plus
- Netherlands Architecture Institute, a former Dutch architecture institute in Rotterdam
- Network Advertising Initiative, an industry trade group that develops self-regulatory standards for online advertising
- Network Associates, Inc., a corporation now known as McAfee, Inc.
- New Alchemy Institute, a former research center and settlement in Cape Cod, Massachusetts (1969-1991)
- New Atlantic Initiative, a defunct arm of the American Enterprise Institute
- Norwegian Air International, an Irish airline

== Places ==
- Nairobi
- Nai, Rajasthan, a village in India
- Nai, Razavi Khorasan, a village in Razavi Khorasan Province, Iran
- County of Nairn, Scotland, Chapman code NAI

== Science and technology ==
- Network Access Identifier, an Internet standard defined in RFC 4282
- Sodium iodide (NaI), a white, crystalline salt
- NaI Scintillator

== Other uses ==
- Nai (caste), in India
- Nai (noble title), a Thai noble title
- Nai language, a language of Papua New Guinea
- National Archives of India, the official archives of the government of India
- North Adria Aviation (ICAO code), a Croatian airline
- North Allegheny Intermediate High School, in McCandless, Pennsylvania
- Nai, or three-legged softshell turtle, from Chinese mythology

== See also ==
- Nay (disambiguation)
- Ney (disambiguation)
- Nal (disambiguation)
