= The End Is Nigh =

The end is nigh is a phrase frequently used in relation to potential apocalyptical and eschatological events or the Biblical Apocalypse (nigh is an older word for near).

It can also refer to the following:

== Film ==
- "The End is Nigh", a chapter title in the Malcolm X documentary Seven Songs for Malcolm X
- Kiamat Sudah Dekat (The End is Nigh), a 2003 Indonesian film by Deddy Mizwar

== Games and video games ==
- Watchmen: The End Is Nigh, an episodic video game series
- The End Is Nigh (video game), a 2017 video game

== Literature ==
- The End Is Nigh (fanzine), defunct British fanzine
- The End is Nigh, the first book in the apocalyptic anthology trilogy The Apocalypse Triptych

== Music ==
- The End Is Nigh, a 2013 parody of the Lady Gaga song "You and I" by YouTube Internet personality VenetianPrincess
- The End is Nigh, a song by Irish rock band Bell X1 on their 2013 album Chop Chop
- Wake (The End Is Nigh), a song by American metal band Trivium on their 2013 album Vengeance Falls
- The End is Nigh, a song by Dutch doom metal band Officium Triste on their 2019 album The Death of Gaia

== Other uses ==
- The End is Nigh, the last solo show before the semi-retirement of Tony Allen

== See also ==
- The End is Nye, a 2022 television series starring Bill Nye
- Nigh
- Nye (disambiguation)
- End (disambiguation)
