= Ney (disambiguation) =

The ney is a wind musical instrument, where the Turkish ney and Persian ney are subtypes.

Ney or NEY may also refer to:

== Places ==
- Ney, Germany, a municipality in Rhineland-Palatinate
- Ney, Iran, a village in Kurdistan Province
- Ney Ahmad Beyg, also known as Ney, a village in Ardabil Province, Iran
- Ney, Jura, France, a commune of the Jura département
- Ney, Ohio, United States, a village
- Ney, Leh, a village in Ladakh, India
- Ney Island, Nunavut, Canada
- Fort de Roppe, also known as Fort Ney, Belfort, France
- Fort Ney (Fransecky), Strasbourg, France

== People ==
- Neymar, nicknamed "Ney"
- Ney (surname)
- Ney (given name)

== Other uses ==
- ney, ISO 639-3 code for the Neyo language, spoken in Ivory Coast

== See also ==
- Nei (disambiguation)
- Nay (disambiguation)
- Neigh (disambiguation)
