= NEL =

NEL or Nel may refer to:

== People, characters, figures ==
- Nel (name), a list of people with the surname, given name or nickname
- Nel (mythology), a language scholar and ancestor of the Irish people in Irish mythology

=== Fictional characters ===
- Nel Tu, a character in the Bleach manga/anime series
- Nel Rawlison, a main character in In Desert and Wilderness, Henryk Sienkiewicz's 1911 novel
- Nel, a dragon in a side story of Fire Emblem Engage, a role-playing game

== Places ==
- Naval Air Engineering Station Lakehurst's (also called NAEC Airport) IATA code
- Nelson railway station's National Rail station code
- North East Lincolnshire, a unitary authority in England
- North East Line, Singapore
- NEL pipeline (Norddeutsche Erdgas Leitung)

== Groups, organizations ==
- Nel ASA, Norwegian hydrogen fuel and fuel cell company
- Navy Electronics Laboratory
- National Engineering Laboratory
- New England League, a baseball minor league
- New English Library, a British book publishing company
- Norvega Esperantista Ligo, the Norwegian esperanto organization

== Other uses ==
- Nel, an ISO C0 and C1 control code for a newline
- "Nel" (song), a song by Fuerza Regida, 2024

== See also ==
- NEI (disambiguation)
- NE1 (disambiguation)
- Nell (disambiguation)
