= Nay (name) =

Nay is a surname and sometimes given name. Most notable people include:

== Surname ==
- Ernst Wilhelm Nay (born 1902), German abstract painter
- Jonas Nay (born 1990), German actor and musician
- Mitch Nay (born 1993), American baseball player
- Cornelis Nay (born 1594), Dutch navigator and explorer
- Kong Nay (born 1946), Cambodian musician

== Given name ==
Nay (Burmese: နေ; lit. "sun") is a common Burmese name:

- Nay Toe (born 1981), Burmese film actor and comedian
- Nay Win Maung
- Ne Win
- Nay Zin Lat
- Nay Htoo Naing
- Nay Chi Oo
- Nay Shwe Thway Aung
- Nay Rein Kyaw
- Nay Win Myint
- Nay Phone Latt
- Nay Soe Maung
- Nay Lin Aung
- Nay Myo Aung
- Nay Myo Thant
- Nay Lin Tun
- Nay Myo Wai

Others:

- Nay Sleiman, Lebanese pop singer

== Single name ==
- Djenar Maesa Ayu, an Indonesian writer also known as Nay
