= Europa Universalis IV =

2013 video game

- Developer: Paradox Development Studio
- Publisher: Paradox Interactive
- Director: Johan Andersson
- Producer: Linda Kiby
- Designer: Johan Andersson
- Programmer: Niklas Strid
- Artist: Fredrik Toll
- Composer: Andreas Waldetoft
- Engine: Clausewitz Engine
- Platforms: Windows, OS X, Linux
- Release: 13 August 2013
- Genres: Grand strategy
- Modes: Single-player, multiplayer

Europa Universalis IV is a 2013 grand strategy video game in the Europa Universalis series, developed and published by Paradox Interactive as a sequel to Europa Universalis III (2007). The game was released on 25 August 2013 for Windows, OS X, and Linux. It is a strategy game where players can control a nation leading up to and during the early modern period of history. Players navigate their nations through trade, administration, diplomacy, colonization, and warfare. The game has sold over 4 million copies as of February 2024.

== Gameplay ==
The game includes different bookmarked starting dates called "scenarios", with the world state, borders, and events reflecting their historical equivalents for each. The earliest scenarios begin on 11 November 1444, one day after the Christian defeat at Varna, while the latest scenario begins on 21 September 1792, the end of the French monarchy. The player can also choose any day within the game's time span as a starting date. The game itself is an interactive map of Earth divided into the provinces that compose nations. Each of these provinces contributes to its country either positively or negatively, as provinces can both provide resources to a nation and serve as a point of unrest and rebellion. At the beginning of the game, many provinces are considered "uncolonized" and are meant to represent possible land colonizable by other nations. The gameplay requires the player to lead a nation by balancing their military, diplomacy, and economy. The player does so through their choices as sovereign of their nation, and by spending their available resources: prestige, power projection, stability, gold (ducats), manpower, legitimacy for monarchies, republican tradition for republics, devotion for theocracies, horde unity for steppe nomads, meritocracy for Celestial Empires, and monarch power (administrative, diplomatic, and military).

Players can choose to conquer the world by military might, become a colonial superpower, establish trade dominance, etc., as one of over 500 different nations. The game is a sandbox environment; there is no strict win condition for players. A player's game ends when the player's nation is annexed (removed from the map) or when the in-game date reaches 3 January 1821. Diplomacy is a large aspect of the game, as creating alliances (or vassal states and tributaries), improving opinions, and preventing defensive coalitions are vital to a player's survival. Espionage can also be employed against enemy states to claim their territory or incite rebellion in their provinces, along with other dubious ends. Combat can be waged on both land and sea, during which the game attempts to simulate real-world factors such as morale, discipline, varying unit types with associated strengths and weaknesses, competency of leaders, terrain, and supply lines. Trade is also an important part of the game, where the world is divided into many trade nodes, and trade flows through each of the nodes and can be collected by merchants.

Many major religions, such as Catholicism, Orthodox Christianity, Protestantism, Sunni Islam, and Shia Islam, are present in the game and can provide distinct bonuses to their practitioners. Players can employ missionaries to convert their provinces or can engage in policies of universal religious freedom. For example, the Catholic faith makes use of the Papacy, which can allow a nation to have control over the Pope or to use its influence for other rewards. Native American and Aboriginal religions are also present in the game, most commonly utilizing a system of selecting a bonus for the lifetime of the present monarch.

Furthermore, many of the world's institutions, from feudalism to industrialization, are also present in the game. Institutions normally appear around a certain year, and begin spreading through provinces. The rate of institution spread and where the institution spawns are malleable to player actions. Once reaching requirements, usually consisting of a ducat cost and a certain amount of institutions present in the player's provinces, the player can embrace the institution. Foregoing embracing an institution for too long increases a nation's technology cost; embracing an institution gives an institution-specific nation bonus, as well as purging any technological maluses that the lack of institution may have incurred.

Technological advancements are invested in over time, and require the expense of monarch points. They provide benefits to the nation as detailed below:

- Administrative technology unlocks advancements such as increased productivity, new forms of government, new buildings, and the national idea system.
- Diplomatic technology unlocks advancements such as naval units, improvements in trade, new buildings, and improved colonial expansion.
- Military technology unlocks advancements such as new types of land units, improved unit morale, combat tactics, and new buildings.

Gameplay is influenced by random events that arise periodically for the player. These events can be either helpful or harmful. Some of these random events are driven by an individual country's history, while some can apply to any country and serve generally to enhance the "flavor" of the game. Some events are also motivated by various institutions that occur throughout the history of the game, such as the Industrial Revolution.

Players can choose to play single-player mode versus the AI, or multiplayer over a LAN or the Internet against a mix of human and AI opponents. Single-player also has the option of "Ironman" mode, which locks several settings such as difficulty, and removes the control of saving the game from the player. This means that any mistakes are irreversible. It is, however, the only way to receive any of the game's many achievements.

== Development ==
Early design discussions for Europa Universalis IV began shortly after the December 2010 release of Divine Wind, the final DLC for Europa Universalis III with development, based on the Clausewitz Engine, beginning in earnest in about September 2011. It was first announced to the public in August 2012, to coincide with a showing at that year's Gamescom, after having been teased under the codename of "Project Truman".

Throughout the game's development, Paradox Development Studio released weekly "developer diaries" via their online forums, in which they detailed some features of the game's development. These included information about design philosophy, game mechanisms that were being implemented, and features from Europa Universalis III that were being removed.

During its development, Europa Universalis IV had a greater priority given to stability and quality control than previous games in the series. There had previously been a perception that Paradox's games were not worth buying until several updates or expansions had fixed stability issues. Studio CEO, Fredrik Wester, described this perception as being like "a slap in the face", motivating them to improve. Another of Paradox's major goals was to retain the depth and complexity of their earlier grand strategy games while making them easier for a player to interact with.

Before release, a preview version of the game was showcased through Let's Plays and via a multiplayer event for journalists. A playable demo of the game was released on Steam on 9 August 2013 with the game itself being released on 13 August 2013.

Following its release, development of the game has continued under the same model that Paradox had previously used successfully for Crusader Kings II, with paid DLCs being released alongside, and helping to fund, additional free patches which add more features to the base game. as of May 2024, twenty-two items of DLC have been released for the game alongside many minor DLCs offering additional graphical or musical options.

In September 2020, Paradox Tinto, a newly formed division of Paradox based in Barcelona, Spain, took over the development of the game led by leader Johan Andersson. This team released all the expansions after 2020, while also focusing on bug fixes.

=== Downloadable content ===
DLC timeline
| 2014 | Conquest of Paradise |
| 2014 | Wealth of Nations |
| 2014 | Res Publica |
| 2014 | Art of War |
| 2015 | El Dorado |
| 2015 | Common Sense |
| 2015 | The Cossacks |
| 2016 | Mare Nostrum |
| 2016 | Rights of Man |
| 2017 | Mandate of Heaven |
| 2017 | Third Rome |
| 2017 | Cradle of Civilization |
| 2018 | Rule Britannia |
| 2018 | Dharma |
| 2018 | Golden Century |
2019
| 2020 | Emperor |
| 2021 | Leviathan |
| 2021 | Origins |
| 2022 | Lions of the North |
| 2023 | Domination |
| 2023 | King of Kings |
| 2024 | Winds of Change |

Several downloadable content (DLC) have been released for the game. All DLCs are optional and may be applied to the base game in any combination. The most significant DLCs come in the form of expansions and immersion packs.

Expansions bring broader and considerable changes to the game as they introduce new and improved gameplay mechanics along with many kinds of flavor and various balance tweaks. While immersion packs are expansions of a smaller scale as they focus on specific regions to bring them better to life by granting more flavor.

There are also flavor packs (which add new events and minor mechanisms, usually specific to one nation), music packs (which add more backing music), and cosmetic packs (which affect unit models, portraits, and the map). There are also three e-books that have no impact on the game itself but coincided with the release of expansions.

In March 2021, Paradox unveiled an optional subscription service to play the game's vast library of DLCs without buying each expansion.

In September 2024, Paradox announced the integration of Rights of Man, Art of War, and Common Sense into the base game. The DLCs were fully integrated into the base game with patch 1.37.5 in October 2024.

Expansions are often accompanied by coinciding free patches to the game, which may adjust existing mechanisms or add new ones to the theme of the expansion.

| Name | Accompanying patch | Type | Release date | Description |
|---|---|---|---|---|
| Conquest of Paradise | 1.4 | Expansion | 11 January 2014 | Conquest of Paradise refers to the colonization of the Americas. It focuses on the New World and expands the mechanisms of tribal nations, most prominently Native American ones. It also adds a random new world generator that randomizes the landscape of the Americas. The accompanying 1.4 patch also adds colonial regions and new starting nations as well as many other small additions and fixes. |
| Wealth of Nations | 1.6 | Expansion | 29 May 2014 | Wealth of Nations is named after the book by Adam Smith. It includes new mechanisms for trade and merchant republics. The most prominent additions also include trade companies, privateering, and construction of the Kiel, Panama, and Suez Canals. The accompanying 1.6 patch includes a new rival system, policies, extra ship designs, and expanded mechanics for the Hindu and Reformed religions. |
| Res Publica | 1.7 | Expansion | 16 July 2014 | Res Publica, translated as "public affair" in Latin, is the root of the word republic. It focuses on governance and trade. New mechanisms pertaining to elections are introduced, along with election events for the Dutch Republic and a national focus. The Republican Dictatorship form of government is also added. The accompanying 1.7 patch includes extra idea groups and merchant republic factions. |
| Art of War | 1.8 | Expansion | 30 October 2014 | Art of War is named after the book by Sun Tzu. It expands on the Thirty Years' War and the Napoleonic era, it improves diplomacy (especially surrounding conflict and peace treaties), expands vassal mechanisms, and adds new options for waging war. The accompanying 1.8 patch amongst other things overhauls rebel mechanisms, the trade node setup, and AI and gameplay improvements. Over 900 provinces were added, primarily in regions that previously lacked detail, such as Asia and Africa. Art of War was integrated into the base game with patch 1.37.5. |
| El Dorado | 1.10 | Expansion | 26 February 2015 | El Dorado is named after the mythical El Dorado. It improves largely on the nations of Central and South America. This includes the new Nahuatl, Mayan, and Inti religions along with a "doom counter" for the Central American nations. Exploration and colonization of these areas are also expanded upon - for example, the Treaty of Tordesillas is added and conquistadors can explore into terra incognita to search for the Seven Cities of Gold. A custom nation designer is included. The accompanying 1.11 patch includes new events for Central and South America, improved terrain, and general improvements to gameplay. |
| Common Sense | 1.12 | Expansion | 9 June 2015 | Common Sense is named after the pamphlet written by Thomas Paine. It focuses on diplomacy, religion, and internal development. New mechanics are introduced for the Protestant and Buddhist religions. Theocracies are also expanded upon. parliaments are added, with a special parliamentary government granted to England. The accompanying 1.12 patch includes improvements to the peace system, and a reworking of the fort and looting systems. The number of building slots was also decreased, but the existing ones made more powerful. Common Sense was integrated into the base game with patch 1.37.5. |
| The Cossacks | 1.14 | Expansion | 1 December 2015 | The Cossacks is named after the Cossacks of Eastern Europe and the Eurasian Steppe. It adds an estates system (integrated into the base game as of patch 1.26), new mechanics for the Tengri religion, and new horde government mechanisms. Other additions include new diplomatic actions such as threaten war and study technology, as well as the victory card system. The accompanying 1.14 patch adds many UI improvements and another reworking of the mercenary system. |
| Mare Nostrum | 1.16 | Expansion | 5 April 2016 | Mare Nostrum, translated as "Our Sea" in Latin, was the Roman name for the Mediterranean Sea. As its name suggests, this expansion introduces new content connected to naval warfare, trade, and espionage. Now one can put ships on a naval blockade mission or on a hunting naval mission. One can also create trade leagues, offer condottieri to other countries to fight, and a new timeline feature where one can at any point through the campaign click it and watch how the world has evolved throughout the game. The accompanying 1.16 patch includes a major reworking of espionage, several new map modes, new systems for states and territories, and corruption, as well as various new provinces in Ireland and Africa. |
| Rights of Man | 1.18 "Prussia" | Expansion | 11 October 2016 | Rights of Man refers to the book by Thomas Paine. It includes a new "great powers" system where the eight most developed and technologically advanced nations are listed as great powers and have access to new diplomatic abilities. The expansion pack also features new governments for Prussia and the Ottoman Empire, expanded mechanics for the Coptic and Fetishist religions, new mechanisms for revolutionary republics, ruler personalities, and leader traits. The accompanying 1.18 patch introduces "Institutions" and an accompanying reworking of technology. Rights of Man was integrated into the base game with patch 1.37.5. |
| Mandate of Heaven | 1.20 "Ming" | Expansion | 6 April 2017 | Mandate of Heaven refers to the ancient Chinese political concept. It focuses on improving East Asia with the "Empire of China" mechanism, new meritocracy mechanisms, the ability of the Manchu tribes to raise banners, a new Japanese Shogunate system, and expanded mechanics for the Confucian and Shinto religions. The "Ages" mechanism is also introduced and it focuses gameplay on distinct historical periods. The accompanying 1.20 patch includes the "Ages" but with none of the in-game mechanisms, the new absolutism system, and province devastation. |
| Third Rome | 1.22 "Russia" | Immersion Pack | 14 June 2017 | Third Rome refers to the idea that Muscovy (and later Russia) are the successors to Byzantium, thus making them the Third Roman Empire. This immersion pack adds the Tsardom & Principality government, new mechanics for the Orthodox religion, and a new Siberian frontier idea. The accompanying 1.22 patch adds flavor and new government types for Russian countries. |
| Cradle of Civilization | 1.23 "Persia" | Expansion | 6 November 2017 | Cradle of Civilization refers to the Fertile Crescent, which is home to one of the ancient cradles of civilization. The expansion includes trading policies, army professionalism and drilling, the Mamluk government, and new mechanics for Islam along with its various schools. The accompanying 1.23 patch overhauls the Middle East and the Caucasus and adds new trade goods. |
| Rule Britannia | 1.25 "England" | Immersion Pack | 20 March 2018 | Rule Britannia is named after Thomas Arne's song "Rule, Britannia!". This immersion pack adds the Anglican religion, missions for British countries, and naval doctrines. The accompanying 1.25 patch includes map changes to the British Isles, France, and the Low Countries along with a brand new mission system. |
| Dharma | 1.26 "Mughals" | Expansion | 6 September 2018 | Dharma is named after the concept shared by the Indian religions. It introduces government reform mechanisms (integrated into the base game with patch 1.30), a reworked policy system, and many new missions and flavor for Indian countries. The accompanying 1.26 patch overhauls South Asia and integrates the estates system into the base game along with a rework of the policies system. |
| Golden Century | 1.28 "Spain" | Immersion Pack | 11 December 2018 | Golden Century is named after the Golden Century of Spain. This immersion pack focuses on mission trees and flavor for countries in the Iberian Peninsula and North Africa, as well as adding colonization mechanisms and pirate governments. The accompanying 1.28 patch adds national ideas and events for Iberian and North African countries. |
| Emperor | 1.30 "Austria" | Expansion | 9 June 2020 | Emperor is named after the title of Holy Roman Emperor. It features many large-scale reworks to the Holy Roman Empire (new reforms and imperial incidents), revolutions (centers of revolution), and Catholicism (the Council of Trent and new papal abilities). The accompanying 1.30 patch includes extensive map changes across Europe, the new industrialization institution, reworked estates and mercenaries systems, and extensive flavor events and mission trees for several different countries. |
| Leviathan | 1.31 "Majapahit" | Expansion | 27 April 2021 | Leviathan is named after the book by Thomas Hobbes. It focuses on giving the player greater variety for playing "tall". The expansion focuses on new development interactions in your provinces as well as an overhaul to the favor system and colonial nations. The accompanying 1.31 patch provides map and gameplay overhauls of North America, Southeast Asia, and Oceania that include the introduction of Aboriginal Australians and Pacific Islanders along with enhancements to playing as the native North American nations. Mechanics for the Alcheringa (Australian), Totemist (North American), Zoroastrian, and Sikh religions are also expanded upon. |
| Origins | 1.32 "Songhai" | Immersion Pack | 11 November 2021 | Origins refers to the "Out of Africa" hypothesis. It focuses on new mission trees and events for the African states of Mali, Songhai, Kongo, Ethiopia, Ajuuraan, Kilwa, and Mutapa. This immersion pack also adds mechanics for Judaism, new army sprites, new missionary models, and African themed music. The accompanying 1.32 patch includes flavor, new monuments, new formable countries, and map changes to sub-Saharan Africa. |
| Lions of the North | 1.34 "Sweden" | Immersion Pack | 13 September 2022 | Lions of the North refers to the countries bounding the Baltic Sea in Northern Europe. It focuses on new mission trees and mechanics for Baltic and Scandinavian nations including Denmark, Sweden, Norway, Gotland, Poland, Lithuania, Teutonic Order, Livonian Order, and Riga. New government reforms and unique unit types for nations in the area are also included. |
| Domination | 1.35 "Ottomans" | Expansion | 18 April 2023 | Domination refers to the great powers of the early modern period. It focuses on new mission trees and mechanics for the Ottoman Empire, Ming, Ashikaga, Russia, France, Spain, and Great Britain. Content for the minor nations of Prussia, Portugal, and Korea is also included. |
| King of Kings | 1.36 "Byzantium" | Immersion Pack | 6 November 2023 | King of Kings is named after a ruling title employed primarily by monarchs based in the Middle East. It focuses on new mission trees and mechanics for Persia, the Mamluk Sultanate, and the Byzantine Empire. Content for Aq Qoyunlu, Qara Qoyunlu, Georgia, Karabakh, Yemen, and Najd is also included. |
| Winds of Change | 1.37 "Inca" | Expansion | 8 May 2024 | Winds of Change refers to the formation and collapse of empires during the early modern period, particularly in the Americas, Central Europe, and Central Asia. It focuses on new mission trees and mechanics for the Netherlands, Venice, Austria, Hungary, Bohemia, Timurids, Mughals, Aztecs, Maya, and Inca. |

=== Mods ===
Aside from the official expansion packs, third-party mods are available on sites such as the Steam Workshop. The mods can change the game's settings, add or remove features and game mechanisms, add new land masses to the "random new world" generator, and make graphical improvements. Popular mods include "Extended Timeline", which expands the game's scope from 2 AD to the present day, the Game of Thrones adaptation "A Song of Ice and Fire" (Renamed "Westeros Universalis: A Game Of Thrones" in May 2023) and The Elder Scrolls adaptation "Elder Scrolls Universalis", to complete overhauls like "MEIOU & Taxes" and fantasy total conversions such as "Anbennar".

== Reception ==
Reception

Aggregate score
| Aggregator | Score |
|---|---|
| Metacritic | 87/100 |

Review scores
| Publication | Score |
|---|---|
| Destructoid | 95/100 |
| GameSpot | 90/100 |
| IGN | 8.9/10 |
| PC Gamer (US) | 91/100 |

Europa Universalis IV was met with very favourable reviews, receiving a score of 87/100 on aggregate website Metacritic. Critics praised the improvements from Europa Universalis III, especially the new mechanisms and graphics. T. J. Hafer of PC Gamer described the game as an "engrossing simulation that conquers the common ground between your average Civilization V player and the long-time devotees of grand strategy". Negative feedback focused on the tutorials, combat mechanisms, and bugs. Nicholas Pellegatta acknowledged these bugs and other issues were likely to be addressed in later patches and expansions.

In 2013, Europa Universalis IV won "Best Strategy" and "Best Historical" in Game Debate's 2013 awards.

During the 17th Annual D.I.C.E. Awards, the Academy of Interactive Arts & Sciences nominated Europa Universalis IV for "Strategy/Simulation Game of the Year".

The 2021 expansion Leviathan was the worst-rated title on the Steam platform at launch, with only 7% positive reviews. Players complained about a multitude of bugs and untested or incomplete features.

== Spin-offs ==
In May 2014, Paradox released a book, Europa Universalis IV: What If? The Anthology of Alternate History, a collection of short stories inspired by the game and its period, including one by Harry Turtledove. The book was released as an ebook, as DLC for the game, and as a physical edition.

In May 2018, at their PDXCon convention, Paradox announced that board games were being developed based upon four of their franchises, stating that they were on a "mission to expand the IP". The Europa Universalis game (eventually named Europa Universalis: The Price of Power) was designed by Eivind Vetlesen of Aegir Games and has a solo mode by David Turczi. Jonathan Bolding of PC Gamer described a preview version as "something between a high player count Twilight Imperium and A Game of Thrones with a dash of Napoleon in Europe".

== Sequel ==
On 8 May 2025, the sequel, Europa Universalis V, was announced by Paradox.

== See also ==
- List of grand strategy video games
- List of Paradox Interactive games
- List of historical video games
