= Ney (given name) =

The given name Ney may refer to:

- Ney Raúl Avilés (born 1964), retired Ecuadorian footballer
- Ney Dimaculangan (born 1982), Filipino musician
- Ney Elias (1844–1897), British explorer, geographer and diplomat
- Ney Fabiano (born 1979), Brazilian footballer
- Ney Franco (born 1966), Brazilian football manager and coach
- Ney González Sánchez (born 1963), Mexican politician, former governor of Nayarit
- Ney Latorraca (1944–2024), Brazilian actor
- Ney Matogrosso (born 1941), Brazilian singer
- Ney Santanna (born 1954), Brazilian actor
- Ney Santos (born 1981), Brazilian footballer
- Ney Thol, Cambodian judge

== See also ==
- Ney (disambiguation)
- Ney (surname)
