= Claude-Auguste Lamy =

French chemist (1820–1878)

Claude Auguste Lamy
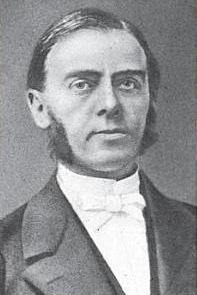
- Born: 15 July 1820; Ney, Jura, France
- Died: 20 March 1878 (aged 57); 5th arrondissement of Paris, France
- Education: École Normale Supérieure
- Known for: discovery of thallium
- Scientific career
- Workplaces: University of Lille; École centrale de Lille; University of Limoges; University of Paris; École Centrale Paris
- Thesis: Sur deux composés organiques nouveaux (1851)

Claude Auguste Lamy (French: [klod ogyst lami]; 15 July 1820 – 20 March 1878) was a French physicist and chemist who discovered the element thallium independently from William Crookes in 1862; as a result, they are considered co-discoverers, although they did not collaborate.

== Early life and education ==
Lamy was born in the commune of Ney in the department of Jura, France in 1820. Lamy's father-in-law was Frédéric Kuhlmann.

After secondary school in Poligny, Dole and finally Paris, Auguste Lamy entered the École Normale Supérieure and was a fellow student of Louis Pasteur; he graduated in 1842. He became a teacher at and again in Lille. In 1845, he was awarded the agrégation in physics and the licencié in natural sciences.

== Working life ==
From 1848 to 1850, he began his career as a physics teacher at a college in Lille (following Louis Pasteur there), then at Limoges, then at the Écoles académiques de Lille from 1852. He defended his doctoral thesis in Paris in 1851. He taught about thermodynamics, industrial physics and hydraulic presses, distillation and explosions.

In 1854 he became a professor at the faculty of sciences of Lille (Université Lille Nord de France). He taught at École des arts industriels et des mines (École centrale de Lille). In 1866 he changed to the École Centrale des Arts et Manufactures (École centrale de Paris).was awarded the chair of physics at the faculté des sciences de Lille in 1854.

He also taught at the École des arts industriels et des mines in Lille (École centrale de Lille) for 11 years before moving to Paris, where in 1865 he was awarded the Chair of Industrial Chemistry at the École centrale des arts et manufactures, as successor to Anselme Payen.

A member of the Société des sciences, de l'agriculture et des arts de Lille, he became president of the Société française de chimie in 1873.

=== Discovery of thallium ===
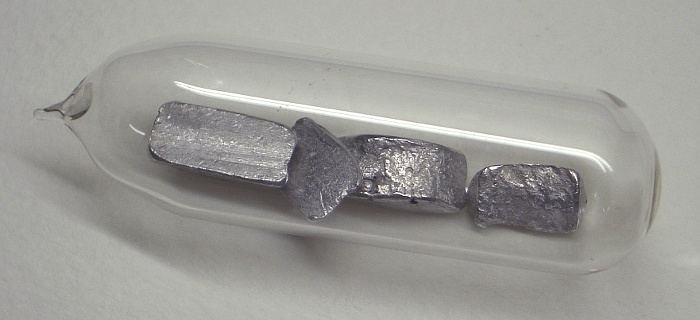
New chemical element thallium isolated and identified spectrometrically in 1861-1862 in Lille by Lamy

In 1862, in Lille, Claude Auguste Lamy identifies and isolates 14 grams of the element thallium using the spectroscope loaned by his brother-in-law, the chemist Jules Frédéric Kuhlmann. In 1861, however, this chemical element had been previously described by William Crookes who was studying by spectroscopy the light emitted by a heated selenium ore.

== Later life ==
He was a member of the board of directors of établissements Kuhlmann from 1870 to 1878, founded by his father-in-law. Lamy died in 1878.
