= Nie (surname) =

Nie (simplified Chinese: 聂; traditional Chinese: 聶; pinyin: Niè) is a Chinese surname. It is the 126th surname in the Hundred Family Surnames. It is spelled Nip in Cantonese and Nieh in Wade–Giles.It is mainly distributed in Henan, and some are distributed in Jiangxi, Fujian, Hubei, Taiwan and other places.

One branch of the Nie family who were descendants of the traitorous Nie Yi changed their surname to Zhang to avoid being associated with him. Descendants of this line include Cao Wei official Zhang Liao.

== Notable people ==
- Nie Bichu, mayor of Tianjin
- Nie Er, Chinese composer in the 20th century
- Nie Haisheng, Chinese astronaut
- Nie Li, lieutenant general of People's Liberation Army, daughter of Nie Rongzhen
- Nie Rongzhen, marshal of the People's Liberation Army
- Nie Shicheng, general in Qing Dynasty
- Nie Weiping, professional weiqi player
- Nie Yuan, actor
- Nie Yuanzi, key figure in the Cultural Revolution
- Nie Xiaoqian, fictional character in eponymous story by Pu Songling
- Nieh Pin-chieh (聶品潔; born 1988), Taiwanese swimmer who specialized in sprint freestyle events

== See also ==
- Nie (disambiguation)
- Nia (given name)
