= École des arts industriels et des mines =

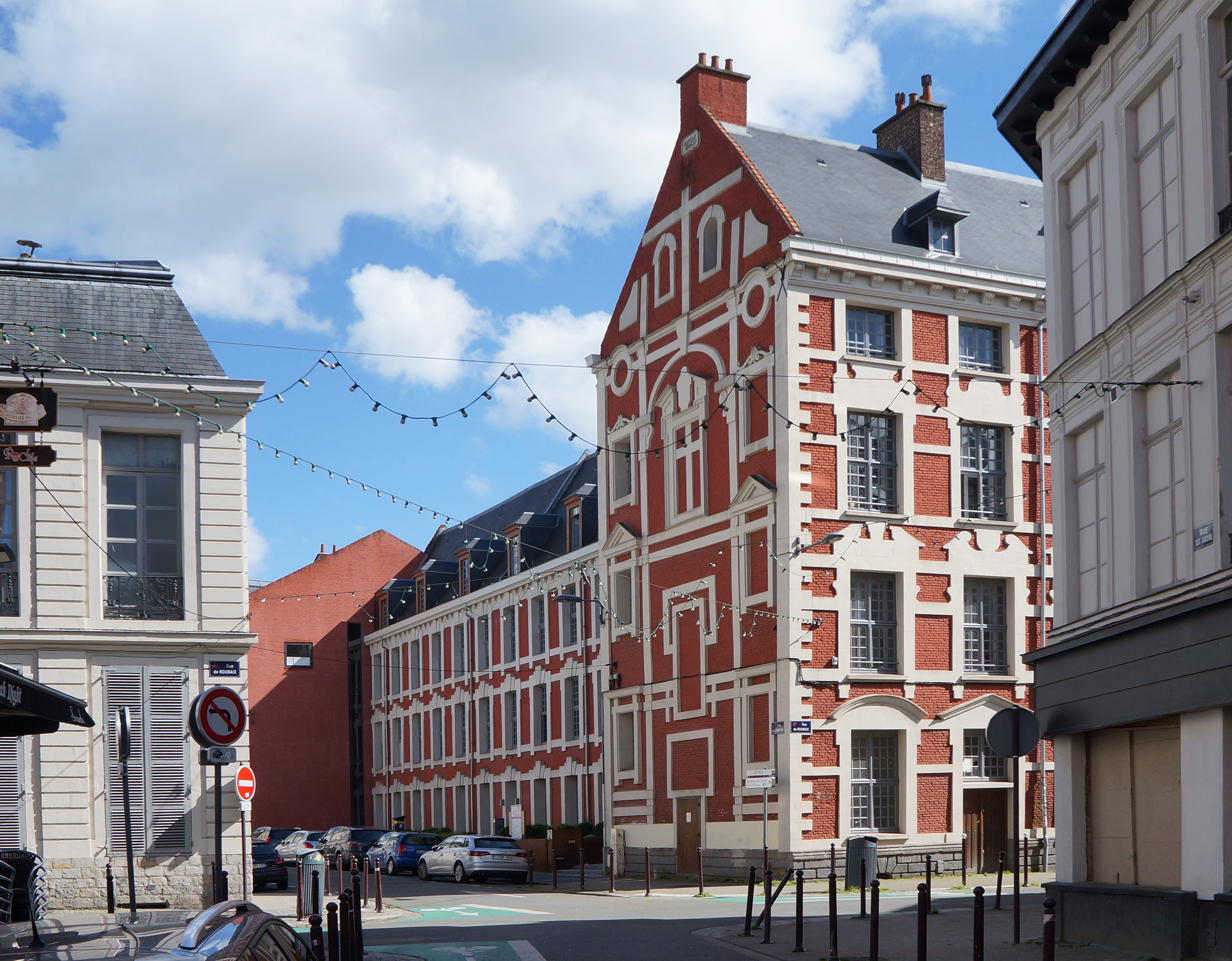
- Type: Public engineering school
- Established: 1854
- Affiliations: École centrale de Lille; University of Lille
- Students: below 126
- Location: Lille, France; 50°38′17.89″N 3°4′6.94″E

École des arts industriels et des mines is the name used during the Second French Empire to designate the French engineering school established in 1854 in Lille, North of France. It succeeded the municipal chairs of experimental physics, applied chemistry and mechanics that were established in 1817. Its heir as a graduate engineering school is École Centrale de Lille.

== History ==
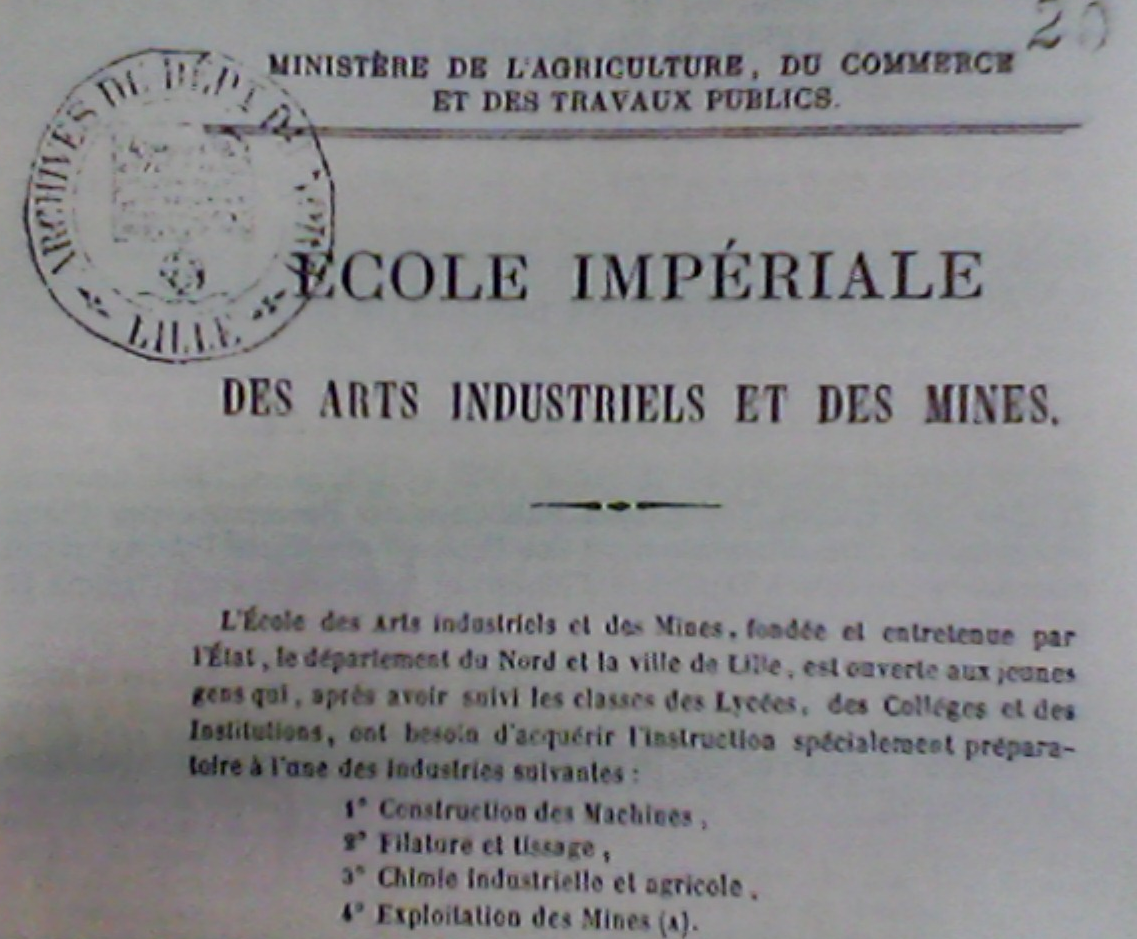
École impériale des arts industriels et des mines

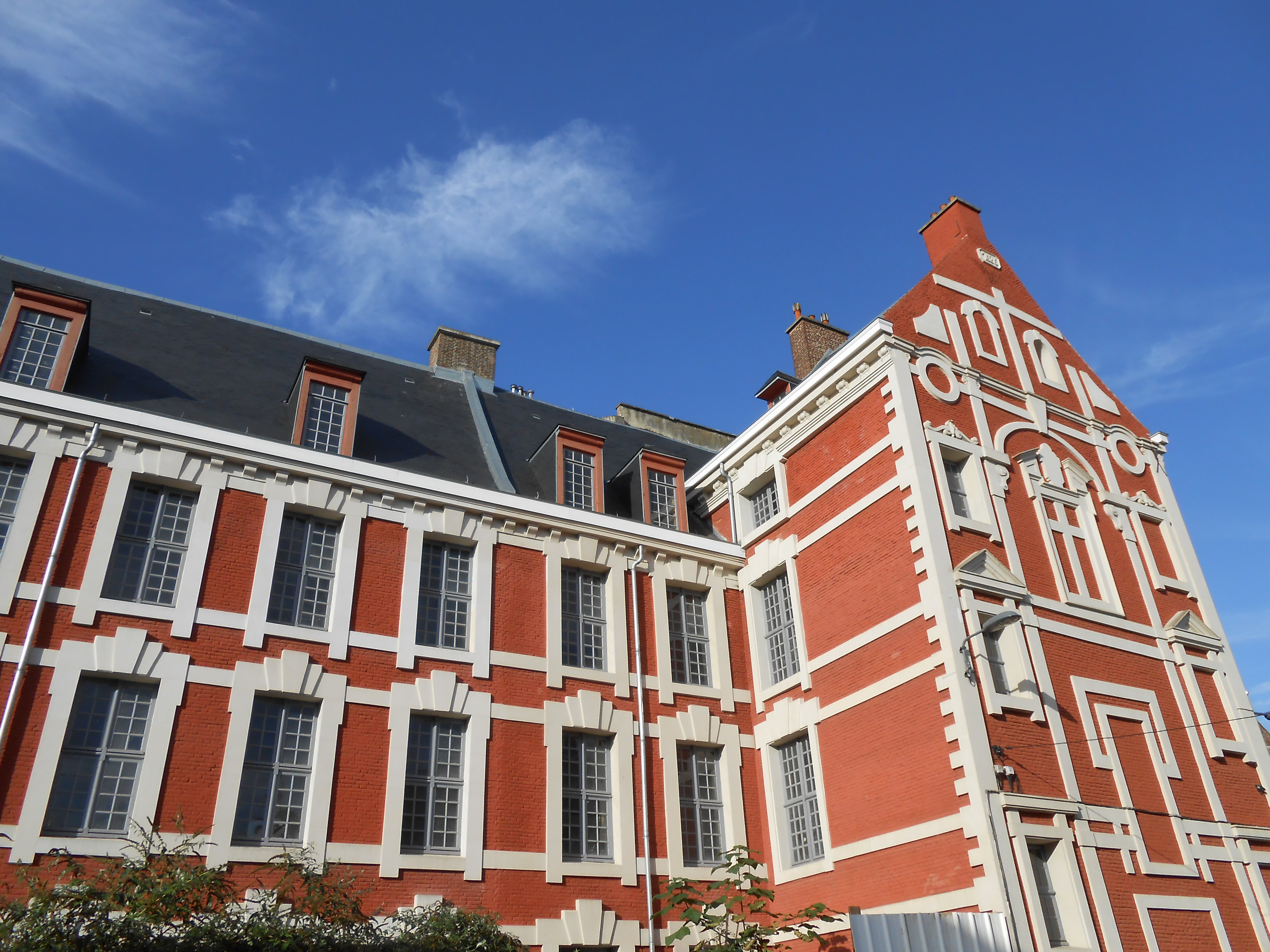
Historical building from 1854 to 1875

École des arts industriels et des mines de Lille was founded in 1854, the same year when Louis Pasteur became the dean of Faculté des sciences de Lille and pioneered applied research with industry cooperations, with support of scientists such as Frédéric Kuhlmann.

Between 1854 and 1871, students attending the two-year/three-year curriculum grew to 90 per annum. Baccalaureate was a prerequisite to admission to the engineering school. The school delivered engineering degrees. The curriculum during the first two years of engineering education included manufacturing and textile industry, engine design, chemistry and metallurgy, mines, as required by entrepreneurs in Northern France. The third year of the curriculum provided optional lectures in engines, mine exploitation, mechanical engineering and chemical engineering.

"The Imperial School of Manufactures and Mines at Lille" (PDF). The Engineer: 565. 21 June 1867. "As illustrating the system of education pursued on the Continent (...) we now supplement it with the following particulars of the School of Manufactures and Mines of Lille. This school is open to young men who, having followed the classes of the lycée, colleges, &c., are wishful to acquire instruction specially preparatory to one of the following industries 1, Engineering; 2, Spinning and Weaving; 3, Industrial and Agricural chemistry; 4, Mining. Situated in the neighbourhood of the northern coal fields, and placed in the centre of the greatest manufacturing district in France, and provided with workshops where is executed work destined for the local trade, this school offers to the pupils studies in which practice is happily combined with theory. (...) At certain periods, and always when the nature of the studies require it, the pupils, under the guidance of their professors, visit engineering and metal works, mills, coal pits, and railway plant in the neighbourhood. The classes are given to engineers and professors who have acquired a practical knowledge of the different industries carried on in the north. The term of industrial studies is two years, followed by an extra year for the pupils intended for the mines, and for young men who wish to follow the profession of civil engineer. The pupils, on leaving, receive a diploma of capacity for one of the four specialities taught in the school. Besides this examination, pupils have to make a report detailing and discussing all that is necessary for a coal pit which they have visited one day a week during the year. A council of professors meets once a month to discuss the management of the school. A commission named by the Minister of Instruction superintends the general arrangements. This commission is composed entirely of manufacturers and engineers."

After the Franco-Prussian War in 1870–1871, the engineering school was renamed Institut industriel du Nord de la France (IDN). Its heir is École Centrale de Lille.

== Programme – industrial series ==
=== First year ===
- French, English and German Languages.
- Industrial Science.-Application of the law of gravity to solids, liquids, gases, different scales, pendulums, floating bodies, water and spirit levels, hydraulic presses, pumps, syphons, &c.
- Heat.-Thermometers, conductors, good and bad, steam boilers, steam engines, &c.
- Electricity. - Different batteries, coils, electro-magnetic machines, &c.
- Optics.- Telescopes, reflectors, spectacles, microscopes, &c.
- Photography.- Apparatus, manipulations.
- Industrial Chemistry.-Metals.- Potassium, sodium, sal ammoniac, lime, earths, clays, iron, tin, zinc, lead, copper, mercury, silver, gold, platinum.
- Algebra. - Descriptive Geometry.
- Drawing.-Sketches and plans from objects explained during the lectures, drawings of machines, apparatus, &c.
- Analytical geometry.
- Mechanics. -Statics.- Equilibrium of bodies, forces, resolution of forces, centre of gravity.
- Dynamics. -Movement of bodies, forces and movement produced by such bodies.
- Hydrostatics. - Equilibrium of fluids, equilibrium of bodies floating in fluids.
- Hydrodynamics. - Movement of fluids, movement of water in tubes and open channels, movement of gas in pipes, steam pipes, different sections of tubes.

=== Second year ===
- French, English and German Languages. - Translations and composition of business letters, ordinary correspondence, and conversation.
- Commercial Finance. - General. Theory of Finance.-Application of book-keeping to manufacturing establishments, legislation on book·keeping, constitution of societies, markets and sales, exchanges and chambers of commerce, stock-brokers- responsibility of the agent to the buyer and seller. bills of exchange and bankers' drafts, assignments and bankruptcies, tribunals of commerce.
- Industrial Economy.-Situation for an Establishment.- Neighbourhood of rivers, streams, &c.; railways, towns, and coal pits, supplies, situation.
- Division of Work. - Its great advantages, means to obtain it advantages and disadvantages of large concerns, conditions of fixed and proportional expenses.
- Workmen.- Conditions of engagement, duty to them, Conseil des Prud’hommes, benefit societies, workmen's cities, food, schools.
- Machines.- Their influence on production.
- Management.- Profit.-General formula, influence of fixed and proportional expenses on the profit, importance of the quantity made .
- Fixed Expenses.- Formula of annual depreciation of the worth of buildings and machinery, advantages of self.acting apparatus, purchase of machines, boilers, shafting, &c., expenses of management, repairs.
- Proportional Expenses. -Advantages of large capitals .
- Labour.- Payment to induce workmen to do more or to do it better, piece work, pay in mines, workshops, mills, books kept, raw materials employed, purchase, account of labour and quantity of material used, cost price, competition, law of supply and demand, monopoly, markets, sales, commission, management of coal pits.
- Industrial Science. -Combustion, evaporation, ventilation of hearths, stoves, and factories, distillation and purification of liquids, drying, heating, and fusion of solids.
- Industrial Organic Chemistry.-Starch, grains, sugar, fermentations, colouring matters, principles of the art of dyeing, bone char and animal chemistry.
- Sanitary Science.- Drawing.-Mechanical Plans .-Sketches of various parts of machines. The pupils draw machines suitable for the trade for which they are intended.
- Mechanics.- Passive Resistance.- Laws of friction, rubbing of cords and belts on pulleys, friction of spindles, stretching of cords, resistance of water, resistance of air, machines, calculation of the force of machines in movement, weighing machines, inclined plane.
- Resistance of Materials.-Tension, torsion, crushing action of the above forces on cylinders, squares, bars, &c.
- Industrial Architecture.-Natural stone, artificial stone, limes cements, bricks, scaffolding, &c.
- Engineering.-Machine·making. - Materials Employed. – Metals, woods, various materials, where obtained; means of knowing good and bad quality of materials, principal parts of machines, arrangement of parts, shape, proportion of weight and size in each piece, various parts for· the transmission of movement, study of the means of obtaining a regular movement in machines, ordinary regulators, estimate of the cost of a machine.
- Spinning and Weaving.-Manufacture of Textile Fabrics. Tearing drafts, flax, and hemp, spinning cotton, spinning wool, weaving wool.
- Study of Spinning and Weaving Establishments.-Study of machines employed in spinning flax and hemp, establishment of a flax and hemp spinning mill, study of machines used in spinning cotton, establishment of a cotton spinning mill, study of woolen spinning machinery, establishment of a woolen yarn mill, weaving, power-loom weaving, silk weaving.
- Mining. -Geology and Elements of Mineralogy.

=== Third year ===
- Management of Mines.-Intentions of the Science.-Tools and machines for boring, rock-boring, cutting galleries, sinking wells, pumping, drainage, ventilation, lighting, operations on the surface, plans of quarries, mines, position of buildings and machinery, legislation relating to mines.
- Second Part of Mining. - Railways.-Rails, wagons, trucks, points, turntables, signals, embankments, &c.
- Drawing.-Engines, windlasses, chains, cables, &c., means of descending, ladders, inclined planes, cages, ventilation, air furnace, pumps, brattice, &c.
- Metallurgy. - Preparation of different ores by machines and hand-dressing previous to putting into furnace.
- Manufacture of Iron.-Combination of iron with carbon, sulphur, treatment of the ore, roasting, blast furnaces, metal produced, hot blast, pig casting, moulding in green and dry sand, loam, clay; cores, boxes, malleable cast iron; refining, German method; English puddling furnaces, steel - shear and blister, cast steel, tempering, working iron, tilt hammers, drop steam hammers, rolls, plate rolls, wire drawing, and annealing.
- Construction and Fixing Machines. --Various machines, different kinds of gearing, windmills, steam, water, and wind corn mills, supply of water, pumps, presses, fixing and making water-wheels, steam engines in general working different systems.
- Work done in the Shops.- The pupils habituate themselves to the use of tools, and work at any machine required to be made. This work is intended to enable them to understand the practical part as well as any workman, so that a master can be master of his men. The work done is intended for the trade which they wish to follow .

== Faculty ==
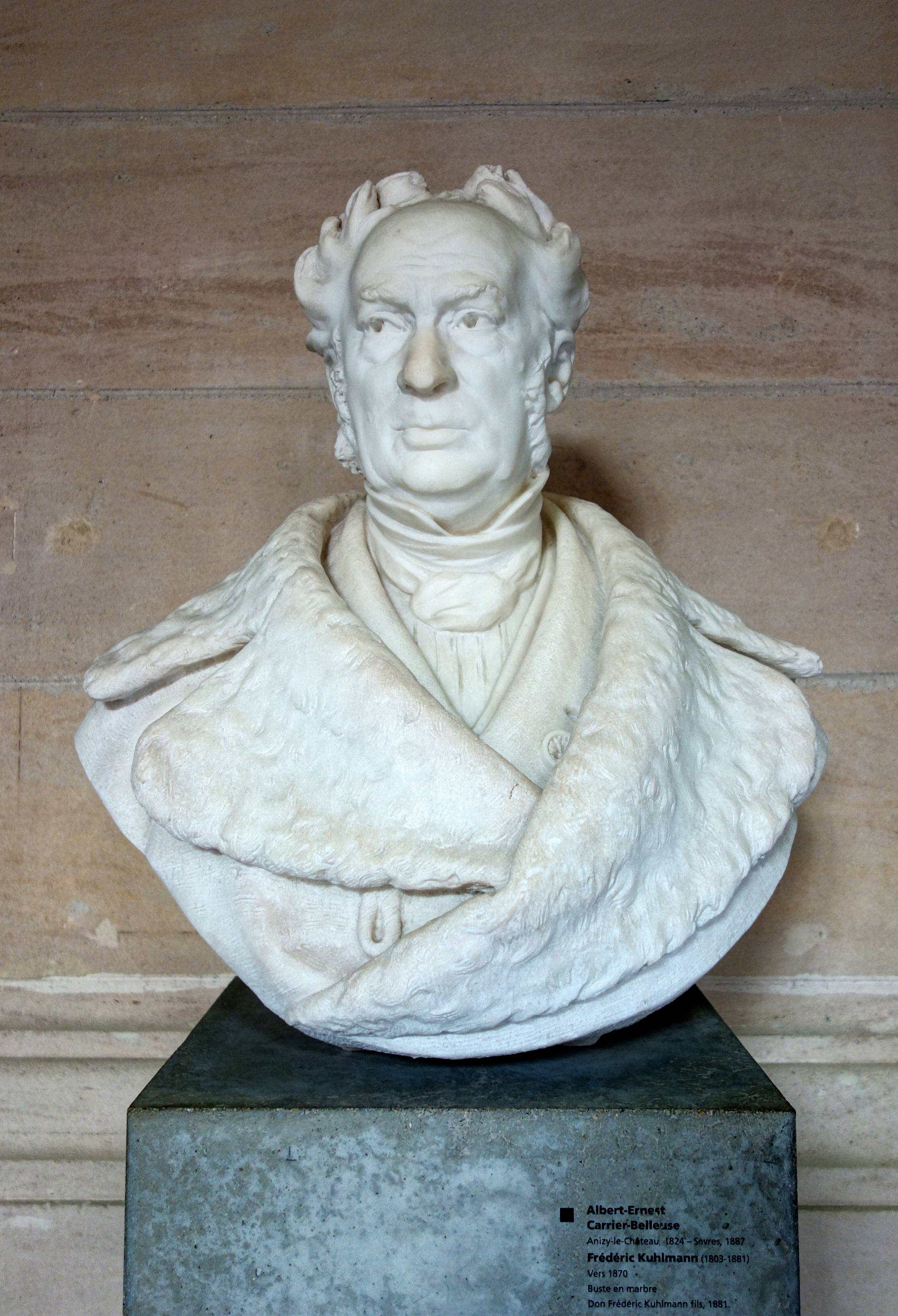
Frédéric Kuhlmann, chemistry professor and founder of the engineering school

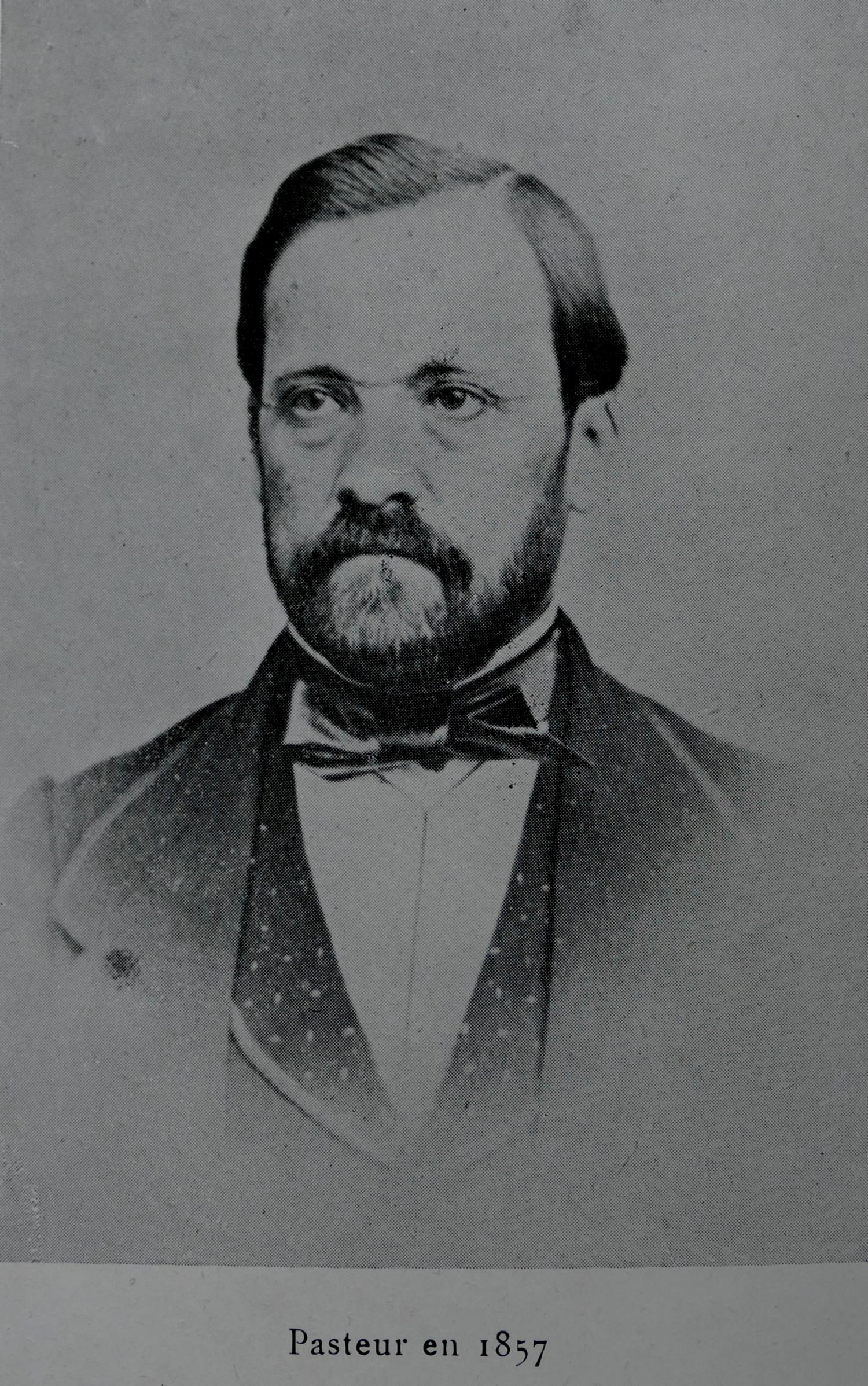
Louis Pasteur, dean of faculty of sciences (university of Lille) and supervisor of the engineering school

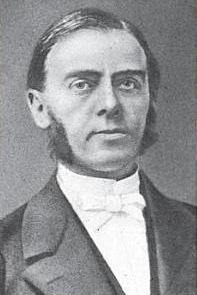
Claude-Auguste Lamy, professor of physics

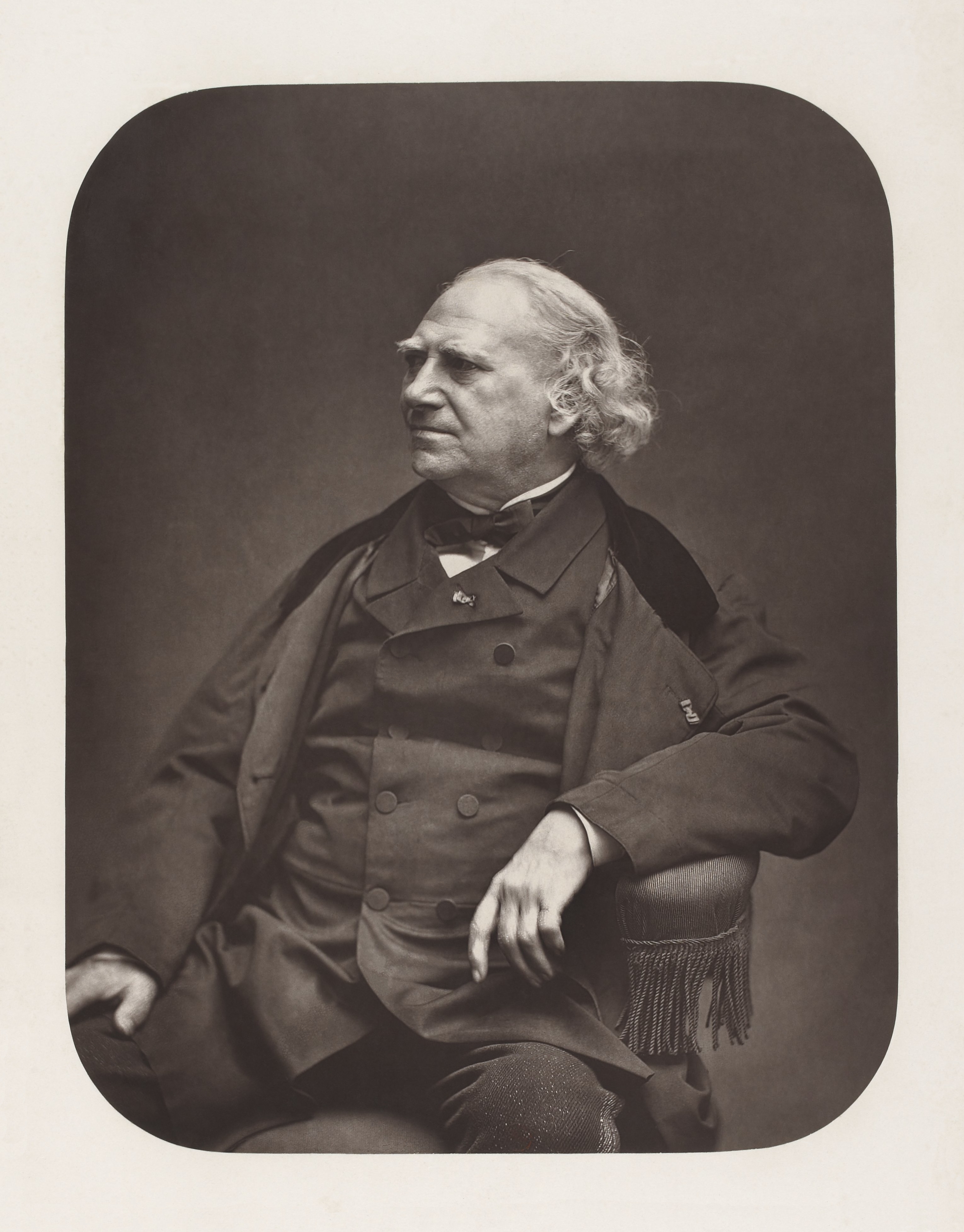
Louis Désiré Blanquart-Evrard, professor of optics and photography

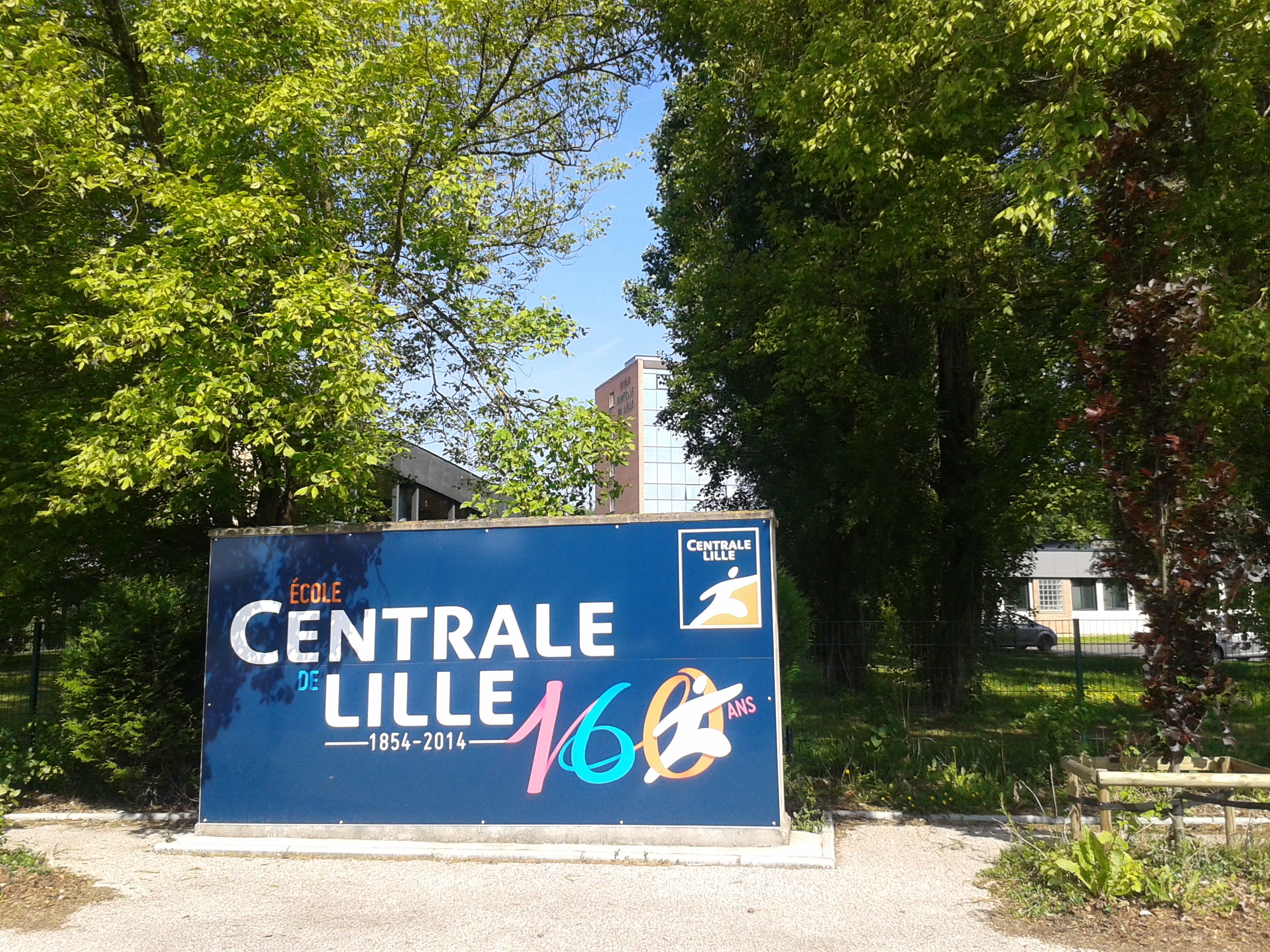
École centrale de Lille : 160 year anniversary (1854–2014)

== Alumni ==
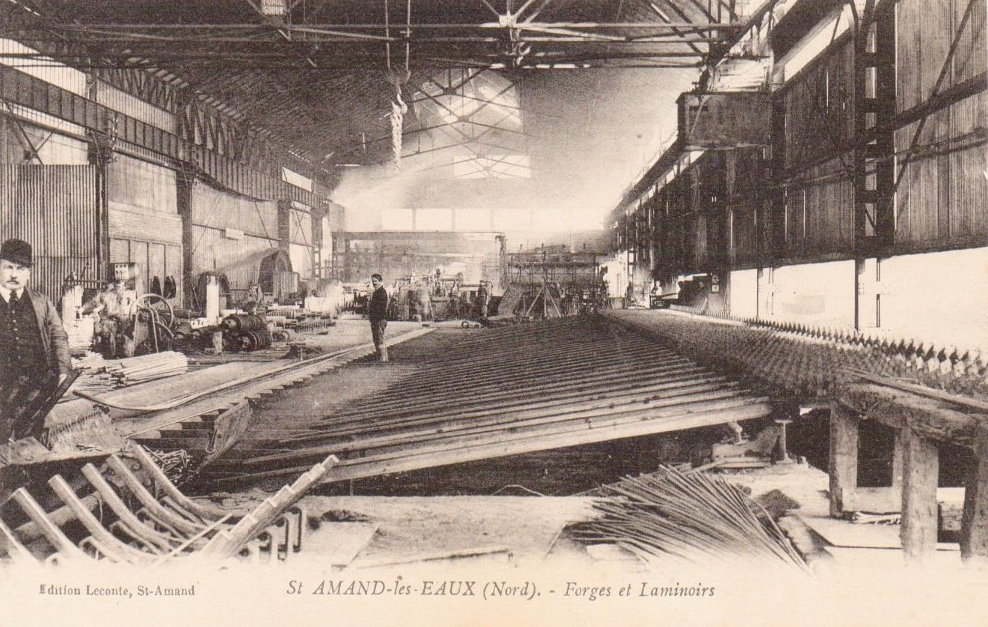
Steelworks owned by Jules Sirot (graduate 1860), député-maire at Saint-Amand-les-Eaux

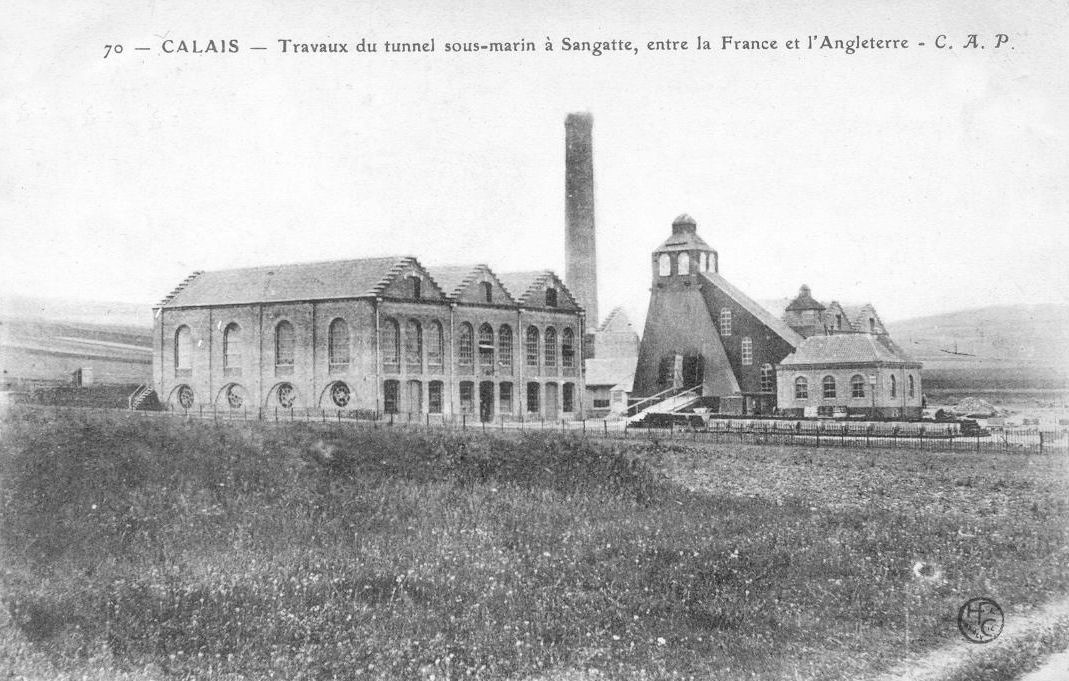
Puits de Sangatte : early works of a Channel Tunnel directed by Ludovic Breton (graduate 1861) with 1,669 m (5,476 ft) dug from Sangatte.

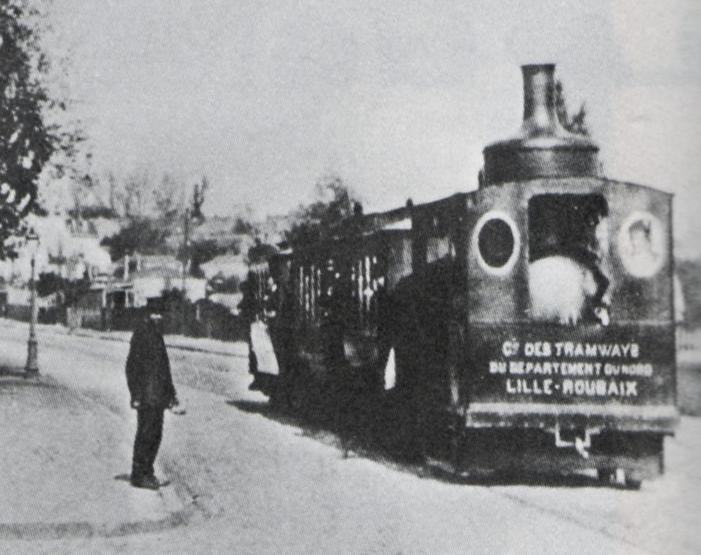
Fireless locomotive, Lamm & Francq fireless tram engine designed by Léon Francq (graduate 1866)

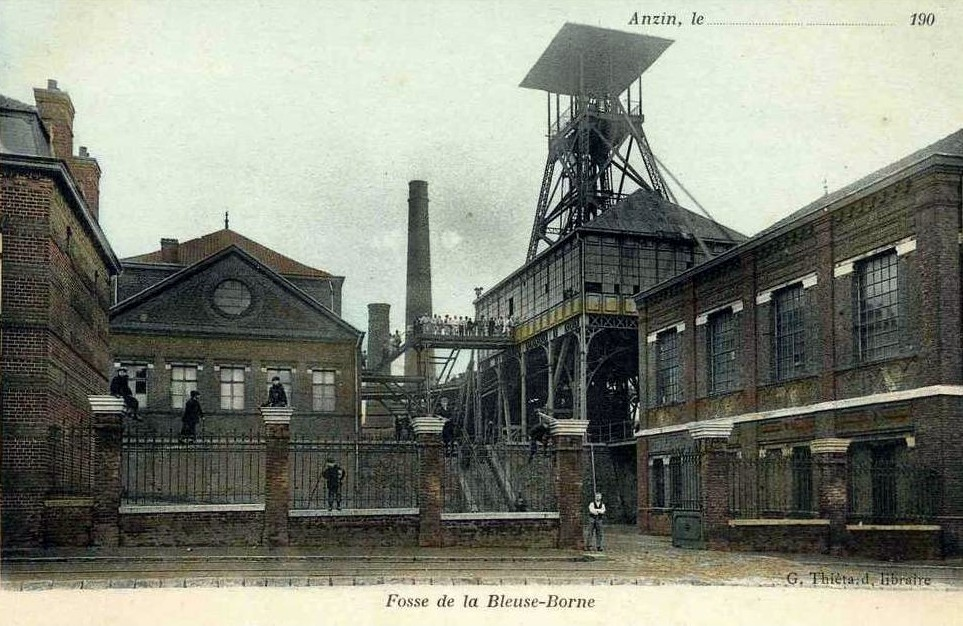
Ernest Boisseau (graduate 1867) as division director at Compagnie des mines d'Anzin

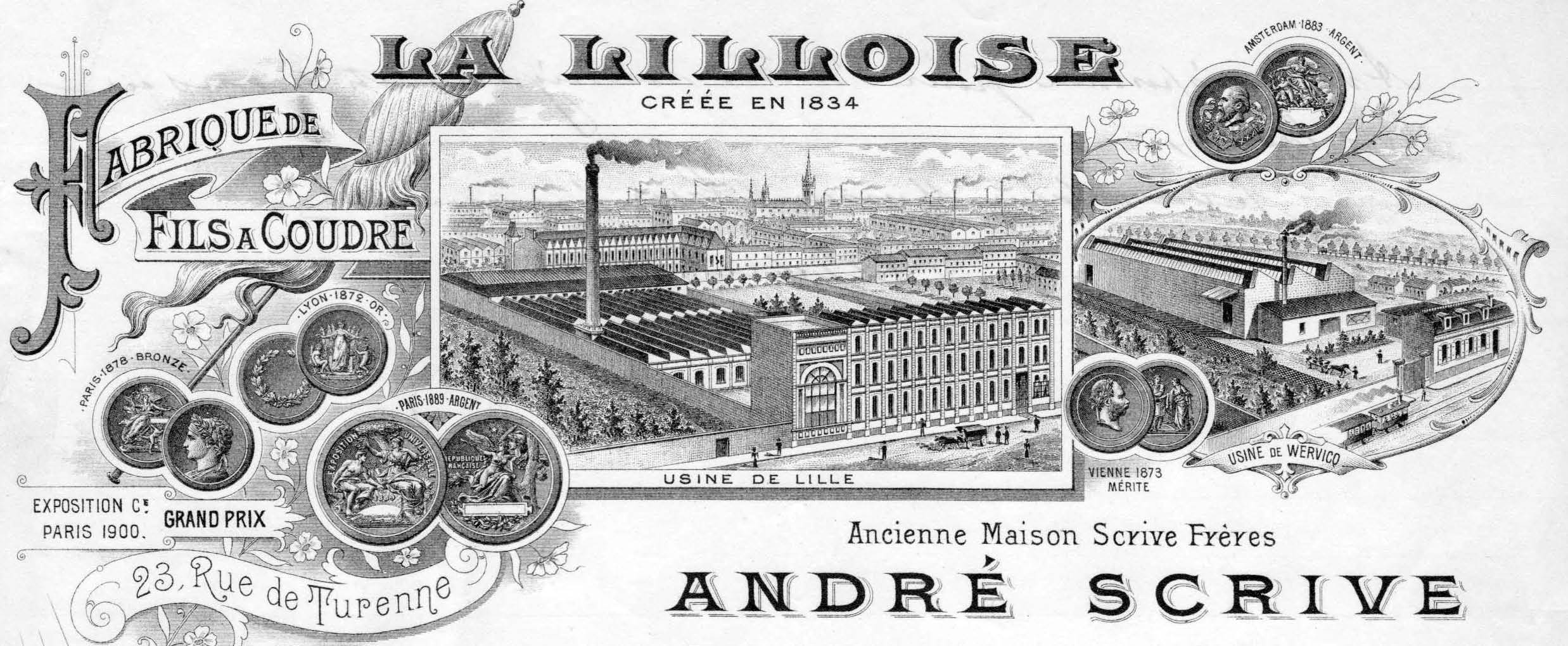
Cotton mill owned by André Scrive (graduate 1868) at Lille

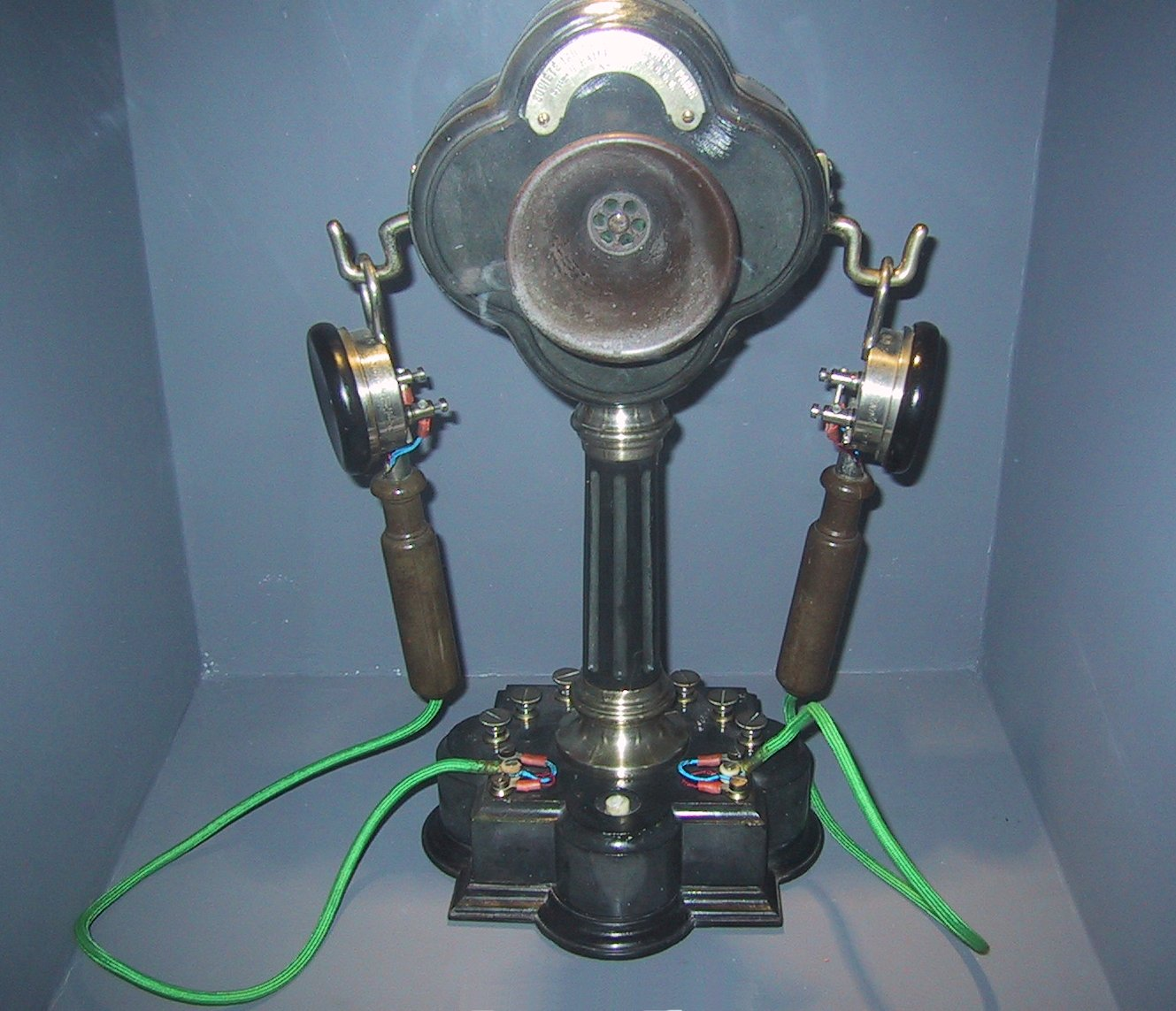
Téléphone manufactured by Société Générale des Téléphones (SGT-CIT-Alcatel), with Alfred Meunier (graduate 1871) as CTO

== Bibliography ==
- "The Imperial School of Manufactures and Mines at Lille" (PDF). The Engineer: 565. 21 June 1867.
- "Evidence of M. Bernot, Director of the School of Industrial Arts and Mines at Lille". Commission on Technical Instruction appointed by Imperial Decree, 22nd June 1863 : French Ministry of Agriculture, Commerce, and Public Works. Abstract of evidences taken before the Commission, presented to both Houses of Parliament by Command of Her Majesty. London: Her Majesty Stationery Office. 1868. pp. 81–84.
- Paul, Harry W. (1980). "Apollo courts the Vulcains - The applied science institutes in nineteenth century French science faculties". In Fox, Robert; Weisz, George (eds.). The Organization of Science and Technology in France 1808-1914. Cambridge University Press. pp. 155–181. ISBN 0521232341.
- Gildea, Robert (1983). Education in provincial France, 1800-1914: a study of three departments. Oxford: Clarendon Press. pp. 323–336. ISBN 0-1982-1941-5.
- Mathias, Peter; Postan, Michael (1978). The Cambridge Economic History of Europe. Vol. 7. Cambridge University Press. p. 313. ISBN 9780521215909.
- Anderson, Robert David (1975). Education in France, 1848-1870. Oxford: Clarendon Press. ISBN 9780198273110.

== See also ==
- École centrale de Lille
