= NIE =

NIE or Nie may refer to:

- Nie (surname), Chinese surname
- NIE (magazine), a Polish weekly magazine
- NIE (resistance) (short for Niepodległość), the Polish anti-communist resistance movement in 1940s
- NIE number, the national tax identification number for foreigners in Spain

It is an acronym for:

- Napoleon in Europe, historical board game
- National Institute of Education, school in Singapore that provides professional training for teachers
- National Institute of Electronics (Pakistan), Pakistani research institution
- National Institute of Engineering, a college in Karnataka, India, now NIE University
- National Intelligence Estimate, a type of report by the United States Intelligence Community
- Network Integration Evaluation
- New institutional economics
- Newly industrializing economy
- Newspapers in Education, a program encouraging the use of newspapers in the classroom as a teaching tool of essential academic and life skills
- Northern Ireland Electricity
- Northern Ireland Executive, devolved administration in Northern Ireland
