= Neigh (disambiguation) =

A neigh is the sound made by horses, horse hybrids, and other equines.

Neigh may also refer to:

- Kenneth Neigh (1908–1996), American church leader
- Mr. Neigh, a fictional character from the 1876 Thomas Hardy novel The Hand of Ethelberta
- Neigh, a 1978 children's book by Roger Hargreaves in the Timbuctoo series
- Neigh Bridge, Cirencester, England, UK; a bridge over the River Thames

== See also ==
- Loch Neagh (pronounced nay), a lake in Northern Ireland
- Nigh (disambiguation)
- Nay (disambiguation)
