= NE1 =

NE1, or NE-1, or similar may refer to:

- Nebraska Highway 1
- Nebraska's 1st congressional district
- New England Interstate Route 1, now U.S. Route 1
- NE1, a postcode district in Newcastle upon Tyne, England; see NE postcode area
- National Expressway 1 (India)
- HarbourFront MRT station, Singapore
- NE1fm, a radio station in Newcastle upon Tyne, England
- Piper NE-1, a version of the J-3 Cub for the U.S. Navy
- Royal Aircraft Factory N.E.1, a prototype aircraft of the First World War
