= Nay Sleiman =

Nay Sleiman ناي سليمان
- Born: Nay Sleiman
- Origin: Beirut, Lebanon
- Genres: Arab pop, Arab Tarab, Arabic music, Lebanese music, Middle Eastern music.
- Occupations: Singer, musician, songwriter
- Years active: 2001–present

Nay Sleiman (Arabic: ناي سليمان) is a Lebanese pop singer with diverse vocal ability and style that attracted a following in various Arab countries. Her name in Arabic means flute; an instrument that Nay adores. Nay was named by her father who was a flute player and a musician himself.

== Professional career ==
Nay started her music career at a young age; in 2001 she made her appearance at the Lebanese music festival by the UNISCO; also Nay participated in the Arab Pop show Star Club in 2004 by New TV. Nay's career took a professional turn in 2006 after releasing her first album "Tijrah Feya"; since then Nay released several singles and video clips. In 2012 she made a video clip for the single "Enta Amary" which was popular in the Middle East. Her latest hit is "Abu Glaiby" an upbeat song with Iraqi dialect; a song that became an instant hit before the video clip was aired.
