= Nai, Rajasthan =

Nai
- village
- Location in Rajasthan, India Nai (India)
- Coordinates: 24.55°N 73.6333°E
- Country: India
- State: Rajasthan
- District: Udaipur

Government
  - Type: Panchayati raj (India)
  - Body: Gram panchayat
- Elevation: 610 m (2,000 ft)

Languages
  - Official: Hindi, Rajasthani
- Time zone: UTC+5:30 (IST)
- ISO 3166 code: RJ-IN
- Vehicle registration: RJ-

Nai is a village near Udaipur in the state of Rajasthan, India. The village is surrounded by the Aravalli Range mountains. There is a lake nearby called "Nandeshwar Lake", named after the ancient Shiva temple of Nandeshwar.

== See also ==
- List of lakes in India
