= Nye =

Nye or NYE may refer to:

== People ==
- Nye (surname)

=== Given name ===
- Nye Perram (born 1969), Australian judge

=== Nickname ===
- Aneurin Bevan (1897–1960), British politician, often known as Nye Bevan
- Gordon Nye Frank Jr. (1939–2007), American dragster builder, often known as Nye Frank
- Nigel Tranter (1909–2000), British author, also known by his pseudonym Nye Tranter

== Places ==
=== Antarctica ===
- Nye Glacier, a glacier on the Arrowsmith Peninsula in Graham Land
- Nye Mountains, a group of mountains in Enderby Land

=== Denmark ===
- Nye, Denmark, a village

=== Sweden ===
- Nye, Sweden, a village

=== United States ===
==== Cities and communities ====
- Nye, Montana, an unincorporated community
- Nye County, Nevada
- Nye, Oregon, an unincorporated community
- Nye Beach, Oregon, a central district of Newport
- Nye, Texas, a former town, now a neighborhood of Laredo
- Nye, West Virginia, an unincorporated community
- Nye, Wisconsin, an unincorporated community

==== Buildings ====
- Nye Block, a former historic commercial building in Johnson, Vermont
- Nye House, a historic building in Fremont, Nebraska

==== Natural features ====
- Nye Mountain, New York
- Nye Formation, Oregon

== Other uses ==
- Nye (play), 2024 play about Aneurin Bevan
- Nye Committee, a United States committee from 1934 to 1936
- Nye language, a dialect of a Jukunoid language of Nigeria
- Nye Lubricants, an American company established in 1844
- New Year's Eve

== See also ==
- Nigh, a surname
