= Fay-ye Sofla =

Fay-ye Sofla فاي سفلي
- Village
- Location within Iran
- Coordinates: 30°53′00″N 49°41′00″E
- Country: Iran
- Province: Khuzestan
- County: Omidiyeh
- Bakhsh: Jayezan
- Rural District: Julaki

Population (2006)
  - Total: 40
- Time zone: UTC+3:30 (IRST)
  - Summer (DST): UTC+4:30 (IRDT)

Fay-ye Sofla (Persian: فاي سفلي, also Romanized as Fāy-ye Soflá; also known as Fā-ye Pā’īn, Fā-ye Soflá, and Nāy-e Soflá) is a village in Julaki Rural District, Jayezan District, Omidiyeh County, Khuzestan Province, Iran. At the 2006 census, its population was 40, in 5 families.
