= Kenneth Neigh =

American United Presbyterian Church leader

- Born: June 1, 1908; Salem, Ohio, United States
- Died: May 27, 1996 (aged 87); Hightstown, New Jersey, United States
- Occupations: Presbyterian Church leader, president of the National Council of Churches, head of the World Council of Churches
- Spouse: Jane (d. 1992)
- Relatives: Kenneth Neigh Jr. (son); Judith Schultheiss (daughter)

Kenneth Neigh (June 1, 1908 – May 27, 1996) was a United Presbyterian Church leader.

== Life and career ==
Kenneth Neigh was born in Salem, Ohio, and grew up in Lisbon, Ohio as the son of a lumberyard manager. He studied at Ohio Wesleyan College and was awarded a doctor of divinity degree from the McCormick Theological Seminary in Chicago in 1936.

After serving as a minister in Allen Park, a suburb of Detroit until 1946, he was named vice president and acting president of McCormick. He merged the Detroit and Michigan synods and worked as an executive there before assuming the office of the general secretary of the Board of National Missions of the United Presbytierian Church in 1959. He served there until his retirement in 1972.

According to his obituary in the New York Times, he was considered by the magazine Christian Century to be the "architect of the modern missions movement." Among other projects, five bankrupt United Mine Workers medical centers in Appalachia were funded, the Head Start program in Mississippi was created, and legal assistance was provided to many civil rights advocates.

He married his high school sweetheart, Jane. They had two children, a son who was killed in an auto accident in the late 80s and a daughter.
