= Nye, West Virginia =

Nye
- Unincorporated community
- Location within the state of West Virginia Nye (the United States)
- Coordinates: 38°20′9″N 82°2′13″W
- Country: United States
- State: West Virginia
- County: Putnam
- Time zone: UTC-5 (Eastern (EST))
  - Summer (DST): UTC-4 (EDT)
- GNIS feature ID: 1549855

Nye is an unincorporated community in Putnam County, West Virginia, United States.

The community is centered on the confluences of Buzzard Creek and Sycamore Creek with Trace Creek along West Virginia Route 34, to the immediate east of the Lincoln County line.
