= Nay Rein Kyaw =

Burmese activist and former political prisoner

- နေရိန်ကျော်
- Born: October 2, 1970 (age 55); Rangoon, Burma
- Occupations: Journalist, former political prisoner
- Movement: 8888 Uprising

Nay Rein Kyaw (Burmese: နေရိန်ကျော်, IPA: [nè ɹèiɰ̃ tɕɔ̀]; born October 1970) is a Burmese journalist and former political prisoner. He currently working as a senior editor for Radio Free Asia since January 2008.

== Career ==
As a young student, he had participated in the 8888 Uprising. Later, he joined the All Burma Federation of Student Unions (HQ) and worked for the organization committee. In April 1992, he released an ABFSU statement against the so-called National Convention and in June 1992, he was arrested, as a result. Rein Kyaw was then sentenced to ten years' imprisonment. He had been arrested twice before his sentencing in 1992. He was incarcerated in the notorious prisons of Insein and Myingyan. He was later released in 2000 after serving time in prison. Furthermore, he was subjected to brutal torture in the interrogation centers. Rein Kyaw had spent six years at Insein Prison and over two years at Myingyan Prinson stated he still remembered his horrific ordeal in jail. An article from The Irrawaddy quoted him: "I still have nightmares after what they "The military government" did to me in prison." The same article also said that he was seeking justice for other political prisoners through the Assistance Association for Political Prisoners (Burma) and quoted Rein Kyaw as saying, "This is, in a way, my revenge for what they did. To expose their crimes." In 2004, he moved to United States under the resettlement program of UNHCR. Then, he works as a broadcaster for Radio Free Asia since January 2008.
