= Kalateh-ye Nay =

Village in Razavi Khorasan province, Iran

Kalateh-ye Nay Persian: كلاته نايي
- Village
- Location within Iran
- Coordinates: 35°10′41″N 58°42′44″E
- Country: Iran
- Province: Razavi Khorasan
- County: Kashmar
- District: Central
- Rural District: Bala Velayat

Population (2016)
  - Total: 0
- Time zone: UTC+3:30 (IRST)

Kalateh-ye Nay (Persian: كلاته نايي) (Note: Also romanized as Kalāteh-ye Nāy; also known as Nā’ī) is a village in Bala Velayat Rural District of the Central District in Kashmar County, Razavi Khorasan province, Iran.

== Demographics ==
=== Population ===
At the time of the 2006 National Census, the village's population was 125 in 22 households. The following census in 2011 counted 56 people in 20 households. The 2016 census measured the population of the village as zero.
