= Nigh =

Nigh is a surname. Notable people with the surname include:

- Donna Nigh (born 1933), First Lady of Oklahoma, wife of George
- George Nigh (1927–2025), Governor of Oklahoma
- Jane Nigh (1925–1993), American actress
- Ronald Nigh (born 1947), American ecological anthropologist
- William Nigh (1881–1955), American film director, writer, and actor
- William Nigh (politician) (1920–2008), American politician

== See also ==
- Nye (disambiguation)
