= Ney (surname) =

Ney is a surname which may refer to:

== Arts and entertainment ==
- Alexander Ney (born 1939), American painter and sculptor
- Casimir Ney, pseudonym of French composer and violinist Louis-Casimir Escoffier (1801–1877)
- Elisabet Ney (1833–1907), German-American sculptor
- Elly Ney (1882–1968), German pianist
- Francisco de Paula Ney (1858–1897), Brazilian poet and journalist
- Marie Ney (1895–1981), British actress
- Nora Ney, Brazilian singer born Iracema de Sousa Ferreira (1922–2003)
- Richard Ney (1916–2004), American actor and investment counselor

== Politics and military ==
- Bob Ney (born 1954), former U.S. Congressman convicted of corruption
- Camille Ney (1919–1984), Luxembourgian politician
- Frank Ney (1919–1992), Canadian politician
- Hubert Ney (1892–1984), German politician, Minister-President of Saarland
- Michel Ney (1769–1815), Marshal of France under Napoleon
- Napoléon Joseph Ney, (1803–1857), French politician, elder son of Michel Ney

== Other ==
- Alyssa Ney, American philosopher of physics
- Edward P. Ney (1920–1996), American physicist
- Martin Ney (born 1970), German serial killer
- Rick Ney (born 1961), retired American professional darts player
