= Ney, Jura =

Commune in Bourgogne-Franche-Comté, France

Ney
- Commune
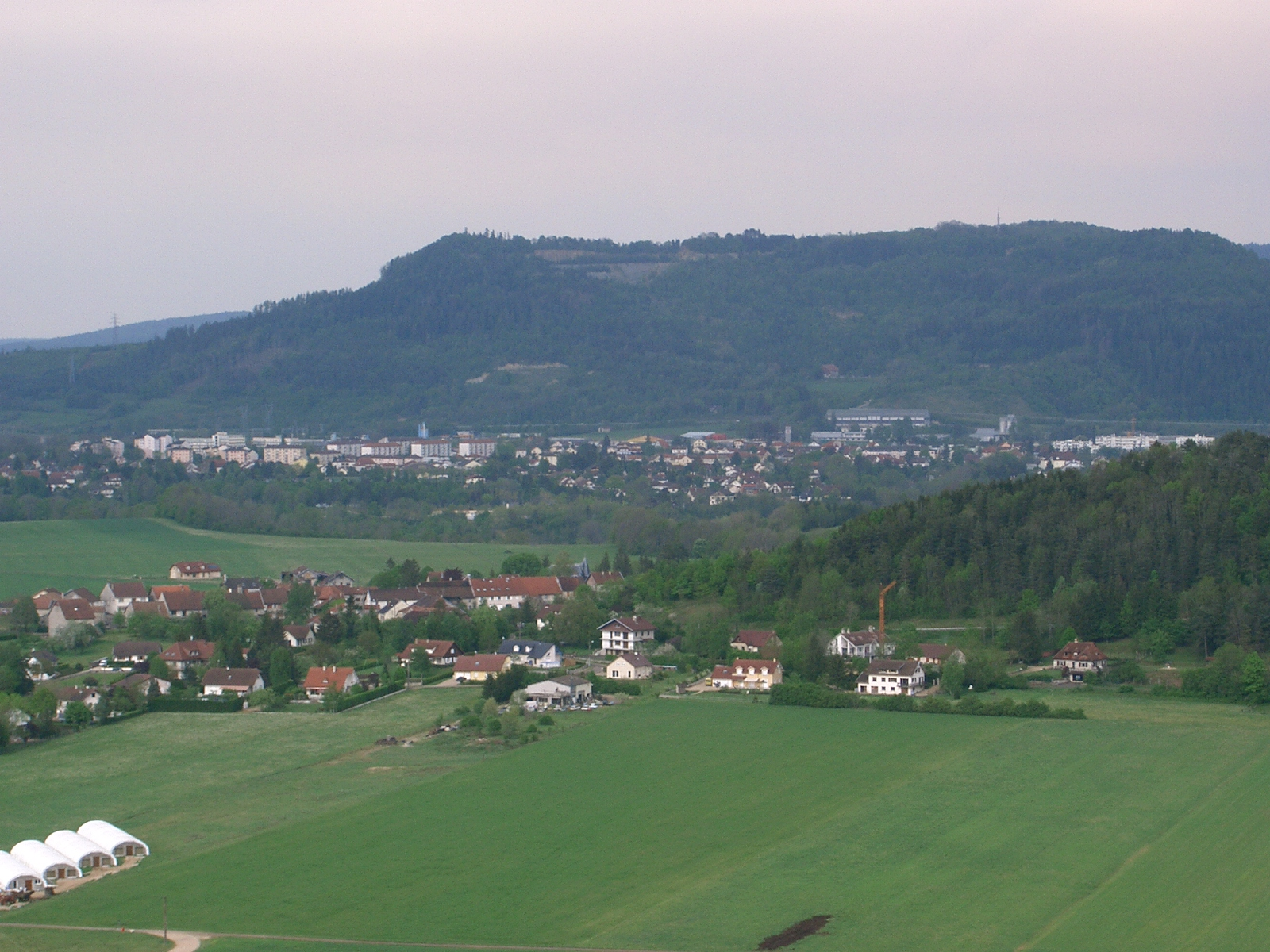
- Ney in the foreground with Champagnole in the background

- Coat of arms
- Location of Ney
- Location within France Location within Bourgogne-Franche-Comté
- Coordinates: 46°44′11″N 5°53′14″E
- Country: France
- Region: Bourgogne-Franche-Comté
- Department: Jura
- Arrondissement: Lons-le-Saunier
- Canton: Champagnole

Government
  - Mayor (2020–2026): Gilles Grandvuinet
- Area^{1}: 7.26 km^{2} (2.80 sq mi)
- Highest elevation: 719 m (2,359 ft)
- Lowest elevation: 489 m (1,604 ft)
- Population (2023): 599
  - Density: 82.5/km^{2} (214/sq mi)
- Time zone: UTC+01:00 (CET)
  - Summer (DST): UTC+02:00 (CEST)
- INSEE/Postal code: 39389 /39300
- ^{1} French Land Register data, which excludes lakes, ponds, glaciers > 1 km^{2} (0.386 sq mi or 247 acres) and river estuaries.

Ney (French pronunciation: [nɛ]) is a commune in the Jura department in Bourgogne-Franche-Comté in eastern France.

== Population ==
Historical population
Year	Pop.	±% p.a.
1968	459	—
1975	580	+3.40%
1982	541	−0.99%
1990	541	+0.00%
1999	577	+0.72%
2007	587	+0.22%
2012	558	−1.01%
2017	574	+0.57%
2023	599	+0.71%
Source: INSEE

== See also ==
- Communes of the Jura department
