= Napoleon in Europe (game) =

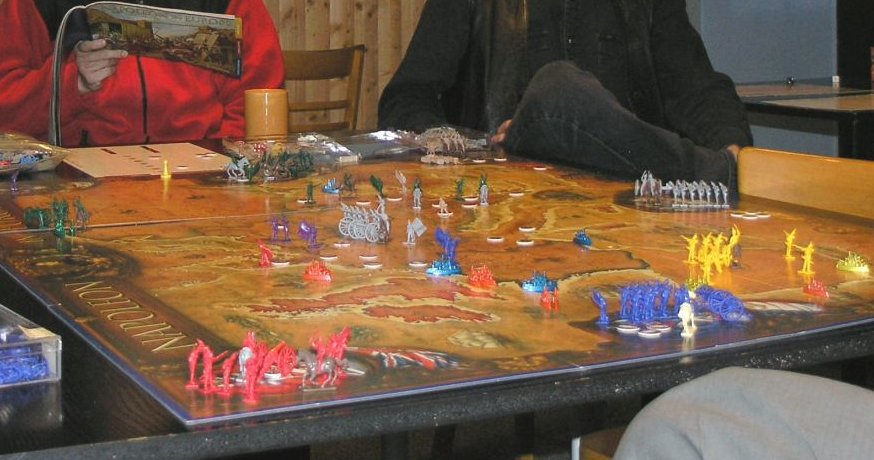
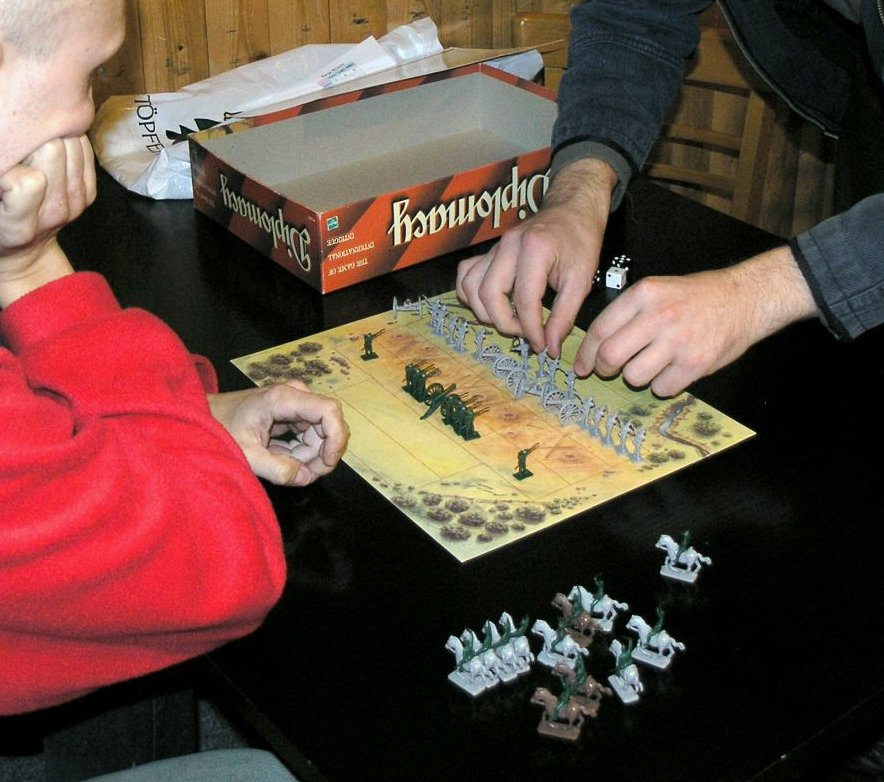
A game of Napoleon in Europe

Napoleon in Europe (abbreviated NiE) is a board wargame produced by Eagle Games in 2001. It combines elements of economics, politics, and military strategy. The map for the game was illustrated by the artist Paul Niemeyer.

There are seven major playable nations in the game: France, Great Britain, Russia, Austria, Prussia, Spain, and the Ottoman Empire. During the game, countries are given time relative to their historical number of troops, so that France and Russia, for example, vastly outnumber the forces of second-string powers like the Ottomans.

The basic gameplay is similar to Risk, in that each player takes their turn to move, and then fight any combats that result from it. However, rather than rolling several dice as in Risk, fighting troops are transferred to a smaller board that simulates a battlefield, allowing the game to take place on both a tactical and strategic level.

Unlike in other strategy games where players can declare alliances and war at will, Napoleon in Europe uses a system of "Political Action Points", which are used up as players establish alliances, declare war, sue for peace, or annex new territories into their empire. The PAPs makes it harder to betray an ally or declare war spontaneously, creating more historically accurate gameplay.

== Reviews ==
- Pyramid

== See also ==
- Victory! The Battle for Europe
