= Hautes études d'ingénieur =

Private engineering school in Lille, France

Coordinates: 50.6337°N 3.0451°E

Hautes Études d'Ingénieur
- Motto: French: Ingénieurs Pour le Monde
- Motto in English: English: Engineers for the World
- Type: Private Grande École
- Established: 1885
- Affiliations: Lille Catholic University, FESIC, IngéFrance, Lille Polytechnicum Institute, CGE, Elles Bougent
- Budget: 17,75 M€
- President: Jean-Marc Idoux
- Academic staff: 170 Permanent; 350 Visiting
- Students: 1,814
- Doctoral students: 19
- Location: (France) Lille, Nord-Pas-de-Calais, FRA
- Campus: Urban
- Website: www.hei.fr

HEI Lille or École des Hautes Études d’Ingénieur (French for School of High Studies in Engineering) is a private school of engineering located in Lille, France, member of Lille Catholic University and a French Grande École. The school trains students during five years and delivers the diploma of Ingénieur (equivalent of a master's degree). The diploma is approved both by the State and the CTI. HEI is a member of the Conférence des Grandes Écoles (CGE) guaranteeing the teaching and selectivity in admissions. In 2019, the school is ranked n°3 by Eduniversal among post baccalaureate training programs of general engineering in France.

== History ==
- 1885: Founding of the school under the name Hautes Études Industrielles changed to the current one in 2003
- 1935: First accreditation by the Commission des Titres d'Ingénieur
- 1968: Recognition of the school by the French State
- 2003: 8000th student to graduate from the school
- 2005: Merger with ESTIT - School of Industrial & Textile Technology - Creation of TIMTEX field (Technology, Innovation & International Management Textiles)
- 2007: Launch of the network IngéFrance
- 2009: Relocation of the preparatory classes into the Irène Devos renovated venue
- 2012: HEI opened a new campus to train engineers in the process of learning: HEI Campus Centre
- 2012 : Relationship between HEI, ISA and ISEN Lille established to create the Groupe HEI ISA ISEN in order to promote relations with companies.
- 2011-2015 : Significant works on the historic site at 13 rue de Toul.
- 2016 : The Groupe HEI ISA ISEN is renamed Yncréa Hauts-de-France. The group opens a non-specialist school in Rabat, Morocco.
- 2020: The Yncréa Hauts-de-France group updates its image and is now called Junia.

== Key figures ==
- 14,700 alumni (HEI and ESTIT combined)
- 5 years of study: 2 years of integrated preparatory classes and 3 years of engineering cycle
- 4 research poles (Chemistry / Energetic & Systems / Structures & Materials / Bio-Engineering & Sciences)
- More than 110 international exchange partnerships

== Academics ==
The five-year curriculum aims at training polyvalent/generalist engineers. In order to achieve that goal, the cursus is divided into two separate cycles:

- 2 years of integrated preparatory classes following the national academic program of the CPGEs (MP – PC – PSI). The courses are focusing on the fundamentals in mathematics, physics, chemistry and engineering sciences.
- 3 years of engineering cycle. The third year is used as a transition between the preparatory cycle and the domain of specialization. During that year, every student will follow the same common trunk, courses encompass subjects such as fluids mechanic, electro-engineering, chemistry, structural mechanic, algorithmic, database...

The fourth and fifth years compose the cycle of specialization and professionalization. Each student chooses a field of study (a major) among the 10 fields of engineering available at the school while keeping an important share of common trunk beside until the end of the program.

The teaching program includes basics in social sciences such as management, economy, and finance.

Specialization domains available in 4th and 5th years:

- Building, Planning & Architecture (BAA)
- Civil Engineering (BTP)
- Chemistry (Chimie)
- Mechanical Engineering (CM)
- Energy, Electrical & Automated Systems (ESEA)
- IT (ITI)
- Technologies, Innovations, International Management in Textiles (TIMTex)
- Health & Medical Engineering (IMS)

Domains available in 5th year only:

- Organization & Management of Companies (OME)
- Banking, Finance & Insurance (BFA)

Students who desire are able to prepare a PhD within the school's labs in the following fields: Automation, Chemistry, IT, Electrical Engineering, Mechanical Engineering, Building & Architecture, Banking & Finance.

== Admissions ==
Most of HEI students enter the school after graduating from high school (Baccalauréat (S) or equivalent). Every applicant has to take the "Concours Puissance 11" competitive examination which is composed of written tasks in Mathematics, physics and chemistry (multiple choice questions in each of these tasks) and an evaluation of the student's academic file. Application files have to be completed online.

Students who attended classical preparatory classes (MP – PC – PSI – PT) may enter the school in the third year of the program after taking the "FESIC Prépa" competitive examination.

== Student life ==
As a member of Lille Catholic University, the school provides its students with access to all the University facilities: (libraries, dining halls, housing, sports facilities, etc.).

== Athletics ==
HEI sports teams play under the French Federation of Sport for Colleges and Universities (Fédération Française du Sport Universitaire) at the Academic Level, the teams usually perform well in almost every collective sport (Basketball, Football (Soccer), Rugby Union, Volleyball and Handball) reaching very often the nationwide eighth-final and some times further. The teams practice and compete at “Ennetières” sports complex.

=== Media ===
- GB Radio: the school's radio, broadcasting 24/7 and entirely run by students
- La Depeche: the school's information media, edited every two weeks in flipbook
- HEI Info: new edition every three months (paper version)
