= Elles Bougent =

- Founded: 2005; 21 years ago
- Type: voluntary association
- Location: Paris, France
- Region served: France
- Key people: Marie-Sophie Pawlak
- Website: www.ellesbougent.com

Elles Bougent (pronounced [ɛl buʒ]; "They [f.] move") is a French voluntary association created in 2005 in order to attract high school girls and young student women to careers in transportation engineering (aerospace, automotive, rail).

== Purpose ==
The association has the purpose to attract high school girls and young student women to careers in transportation engineering.

== Governance ==
The association was created in 2005 by Marie-Sophie Pawlak.

== Members ==
The association consists of natural persons (high school girls and women students in science and technology, women engineers or technicians in operation) and artificial person (companies, grandes écoles, universities).

=== Business and federations ===
- Alstom
- Alten
- Robert Bosch GmbH
- Continental AG
- Dassault Aviation
- EADS
- EDF
- Electrifil automotive
- Syntec ingénierie
- Fédération des industries des équipements pour véhicules
- GDF Suez
- GIFAS
- PSA Peugeot Citroen
- Renault
- Safran
- SNCF
- Sneci
- Systra
- Thales
- Total
- Valeo

=== Higher education ===
- Airemploi
- Arts et Métiers ParisTech
- CFA Ingénieur 2000
- Conservatoire national des arts et métiers
- École Catholique des Arts et Métiers
- ECE Paris
- Centre des études supérieures industrielles
- École d'ingénieurs en génie des systèmes industriels
- École nationale de l'aviation civile
- École nationale d'ingénieurs de Tarbes
- École Nationale Supérieure de l'Électronique et de ses Applications
- École nationale supérieure de mécanique et d'aérotechnique
- École Nationale Supérieure de Mécanique et des Microtechniques
- École Pour l'Informatique et les Techniques Avancées
- École supérieure d'électricité
- École supérieure d'électronique de l'Ouest
- École supérieure d'ingénieurs en génie électrique
- École Supérieure des Sciences et Technologies de l'Ingénieur de Nancy
- École supérieure des techniques aéronautiques et de construction automobile
- EPF – École d'ingénieurs
- Hautes études d'ingénieur
- Institut catholique d'arts et métiers
- ISTY
- Institut polytechnique des sciences avancées
- Institut Supérieur de l'Aéronautique et de l'Espace
- Institut supérieur de l'automobile et des transports
- Supméca
- ISEN
- ISEP
- IUT Ville-d'Avray
- Réseau Polytech
- Université de technologie de Belfort-Montbéliard

=== Institutional ===
- Ministry of the Economy, Finances and Industry
- Ministry of Social Affairs
