= ISA Lille =

French school

Coordinates: 50.6336°N 3.0472°E

ISA Lille - Junia
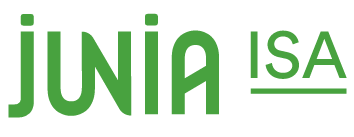
- Former name: Institut Supérieur d'Agriculture de Lille
- Motto: Engineers for the Earth
- Type: Private Non-Profit Graduate School of Engineering
- Established: 1963
- Parent institution: Junia
- Director: Thierry Occre
- Students: 1,200
- Location: Lille, France
- Campus: Urban
- Language: English, French
- Website: www.isa-lille.com

ISA Lille, formerly the Institut Supérieur d'Agriculture de Lille, is one of 205 French schools accredited on September 1, 2018, to deliver a Diplôme d'Ingénieur engineering degree. It is a "grande école", in the French system of Higher Education.

It consists of an institution focused on agricultural engineering, mandated by the French Ministry of Agriculture. It was created in 1963 at the request of agricultural professional organisations, the school's mission is two-fold: education and research. ISA Lille is one of the 4 schools which make up France Agro 3, the French network for Education and Research in Life Sciences.

ISA Lille is a member of the Polytechnical University Federation of Lille, a local group of Catholic schools. In 2016, the group of Engineering schools of Lille Catholic University—HEI (Hautes études d'ingénieur), ISA and ISEN (Institut supérieur de l'électronique et du numérique), merged under the name Yncréa Hauts-de-France. Each school maintains its own degree, areas of expertise, and distinctive pedagogical approach.

In July 2019, ISA Lille was recognized as the Sustainability Institution of the Year by Campus Responsables and earned 2nd place in the International Green Gown Awards.

== Academic programs ==
The school offers a range of degree programs, as well as research and business services, specialising in sectors of Agricultural science, Food science, Environmental science, and Agricultural economics. The school was among the first French higher education institutions to offer programmes 100% taught in English.

=== Undergraduate courses ===
ISA Lille does not deliver bachelor's degrees, however high school graduates may join the integrated preparatory course prior to studying in the engineering program.

=== Master of Science in Engineering ===
Students with a Bachelor of Science in a related scientific discipline may join ISA Lille in the 4th year, the first year of the Master programme. The degree is accredited by the Commission des titres d'ingénieur and internationally recognised as a Master of Science in engineering.

== Research ==
ISA Lille participates in various domains of research activities, such as sensory analysis, soil decontamination, pollution biomonitoring, animal welfare, agricultural forecasting, the study of parasites and fungi, and agricultural statistics
