= ESPOL =

ESPOL may refer to:

- Escuela Superior Politécnica del Litoral – a public institution of higher education in Guayaquil, Ecuador.
- The European School of Political and Social Sciences – a non-profit private higher education institution located in Lille, France.
- Executive Systems Problem Oriented Language – a systems implementation language for Burroughs Corporation computers.
