= Jardin des plantes de Lille =

Botanical garden in Nord-Pas-de-Calais, France

Coordinates: 50.6149°N 3.0682°E

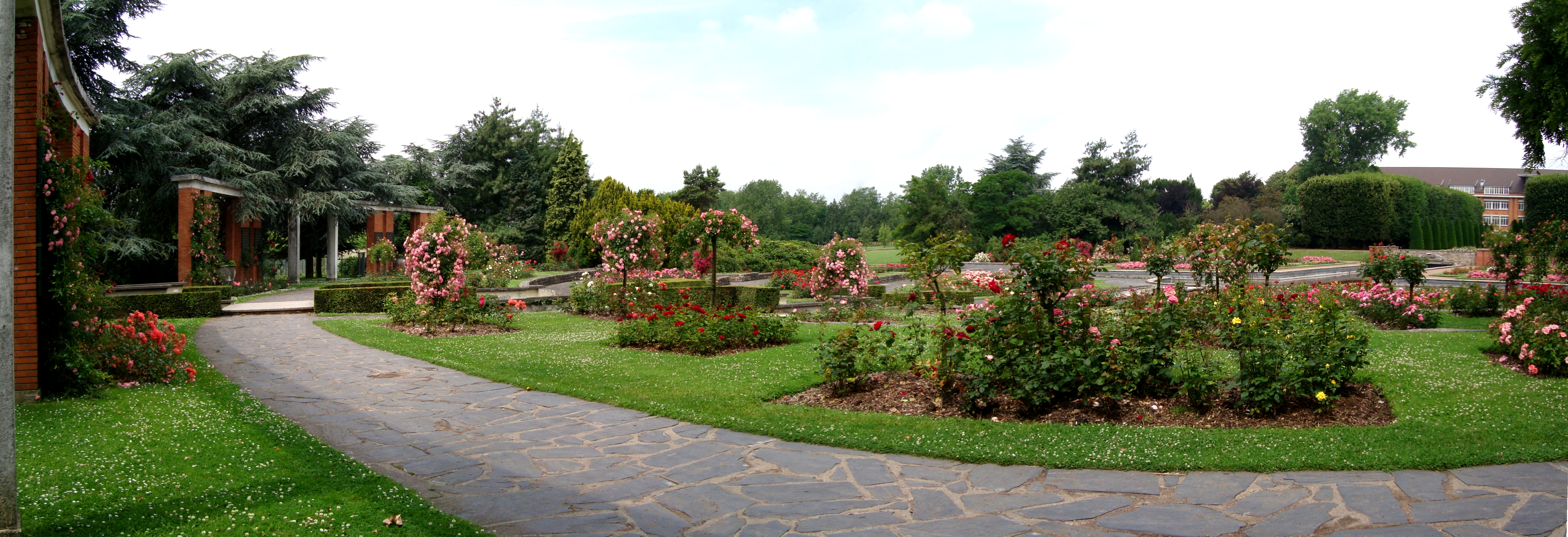
Rose garden in the jardin des plantes de Lille

The jardin des plantes de Lille (11 hectares) is a municipal botanical garden located on the rue du Jardin des plantes, Lille, Nord, France.

The garden was established in 1948 as a successor to various city botanical gardens dating from 1596. It is one of three botanical gardens in Lille, the others being the Jardin botanique de la Faculté de Pharmacie at the Université de Lille 2, and the jardin botanique Nicolas Boulay at the université catholique de Lille.

The garden is designed as a pleasure park, with botanical plots containing more than 1,500 plants grouped by families; an orangery (built in 1952) containing Mediterranean plants such as mimosa, oleander, and eucalyptus; and a tropical greenhouse (1,200 m^{2}, built in 1970) which rises to a height of eight meters and houses some 12,000 plants including bananas, coffee, ginger, palm trees, tree ferns, pepper, and frangipani. The garden also contains a rose garden, trees grouped by geographical origin, and a dahlia collection, as well as a large pond and the city's astronomical observatory.

== See also ==
- List of botanical gardens in France
