= Jardin botanique de la Faculté de Pharmacie =

Botanical garden and arboretum in Nord-Pas-de-Calais, France

Coordinates: 50.6058°N 3.0419°E

The Jardin botanique de la Faculté de Pharmacie (2 hectares), more formally the Jardin de la Faculté des Sciences Pharmaceutiques et Biologiques de l'Université de Lille 2, is a botanical garden and arboretum operated by the Faculty of Pharmacy of the Université de Lille 2. It is located at 3 Rue du Professeur Laguesse, Lille, Nord, France, and open weekdays except university holidays; an admission fee is charged.

It is one of three botanical gardens in Lille, the others being the Jardin des Plantes de Lille and the Jardin botanique Nicolas Boulay at the Université Catholique de Lille.

The garden was established in 1970 when the Faculty of Pharmacy moved to its current location. Its arboretum was created in 1985, and in 1999 the garden was designated a member of the Jardins botaniques de France et des Pays francophones.

Today the garden contains more than 1,000 taxa, including herbaceous plants (117 species), gymnosperms (20 species), trees and shrubs, ornamental plants, medicinal plants, and perfume plants, arranged as follows:

- Systematic gardens (5,000 m^{2}) - 22 plots containing several hundred species. One section is arranged by botanical family according to a modern molecular system, another by medical use or toxicity, and a third by ecology.
- Arboretum - more than 80 species; trees including Abies nordmannia, Acer shirasawanum, Alnus glutinosa, Betula papyrifera, Diospyros lotus, Liriodendron tulipifera, Ostrya carpinifolia, Sciadopitys verticillata, Sorbus aria, and Sequoia sempervirens, as well as shrubs including Bupleurum fruticosum, Cytisus battandieri, Enkianthus campanulatus, Ficus erecta v. beescheyana, Fothergilla major, Garrya elliptica, Paederia splendens, Poncirus trifoliata, Securinega suffruticosa, Syringa afghanica, and Xanthoceras sorbifolium.
- Tropical greenhouse (120 m^{2}) - Cinnamomum camphora, Leonotis leonurus, Ornithogalum caudatum, Plumeria rubra, Pogostemon cablin, Strelitzia reginae, etc.
- Herbarium - 76,500 specimens including fungi (60,000 specimens), angiosperms (10,000), lichens (4,500), and bryophytes (2,000).

Additional plants include Agave, Aloe, Epipactis helleborine, Ophrys apifera, Opuntia, and Orchis militaris.

== See also ==
- List of botanical gardens in France
