= Jardin botanique Nicolas Boulay =

Botanical garden in Nord-Pas-de-Calais, France

Coordinates: 50.6327°N 3.0447°E

The Jardin botanique Nicolas Boulay is a botanical garden operated by the Faculty of Medicine at the Université Catholique de Lille, Lille, Nord, France.

The garden is named in honor of Abbé Jean-Nicolas Boulay (1837-1905), and is one of three botanical gardens in Lille, the others being the Jardin des Plantes de Lille and the Jardin botanique de la Faculté de Pharmacie at the Université de Lille 2.

== See also ==
- List of botanical gardens in France
