= Institut supérieur d'électronique de Paris =

French IT engineering university

Coordinates: 48°50′44″N 2°19′41″E

- Type: French Grande école
- Established: 1955
- Affiliations: Catholic Church, Elles Bougent, EESPIG
- President: Jean-Luc Archambault
- Location: Paris, France
- Website: https://en.isep.fr/

Institut supérieur d’électronique de Paris (ISEP) is a French grande école located in Paris. It specializes in electronics, telecommunication and computer science.

ISEP cultivates engineers in the key areas of IT world: Computer science & Cybersecurity – Electronics & Robotics – Telecommunications & Internet of Things (IoT) – Imaging & Health – Artificial Intelligence

The school was founded in 1955 on the place where Édouard Branly, physics professor at the Catholic University of Paris, discovered the coherer in 1890.

The school has two campuses, one in paris in the 6ème - located in the heart of Paris, next to the “Quartier Latin”, one in an outskirt named Issy les Moulineaux.

== Departments ==
ISEP has three main departments (Electronics, Telecommunication, Information systems) and ten laboratories for teaching and research. ISEP has relationships with several companies in its industry (Thales, STMicroelectronics, ATMEL) and has a strong worldwide program orientation (co-operation agreements with more than 20 international institutions, member of 3 international exchange programs). ISEP also initiated an International master's degree program. ISEP welcomes a diverse range of international students at both undergraduate and postgraduate levels.

== Rankings ==
It is one amongst the top four Grandes écoles according to the French magazines l'Express and L'Étudiant in 2010. In 2015, the school was ranked best in France for "digital" related subject and best overall private school by l'Usine Nouvelle. In 2018, ISEP was ranked at the top of the podium by L’Etudiant magazine (out of 174 institutions) for the criteria “Making a good living in information technology”.

== Degrees ==
The ISEP Engineering master's degree Program IEMDP is a 4-semester program. Its aim is to prepare international students for the ISEP Engineering master's degree. This degree is recognized by the French government, accredited by the Engineering Accreditation Institution CTI and recognized as an international master's degree within the European Bologna scheme. The program is open to graduates with a bachelor's degree and the students join the standard French engineering curriculum starting from the 2nd year of the engineering cycle. Three specializations are proposed:

- Embedded systems
- Software engineering
- Wireless telecommunication and IOT systems

== International Partners ==
Stanford University's Overseas Studies Program in Paris is hosted every year by the Institut supérieur d'électronique de Paris. Every year Chinese students from Huazhong University of Science and Technology come for two years to follow Diplôme d'Ingénieur courses. Moreover, it is also having a special course offering in ICIT Pvt Ltd Savitribai Phule Pune University(Pune). It's a 6 months course in two fields PG Diploma Course in Advanced Computing and Embedded System Design. Other famous partner universities offering exchange program include University of Bologna (Italy), Cranfield University (UK), National Chiao Tung University (Taiwan), Inha University (South Korea), Vellore Institute of Technology (India), Nanyang Technological University (Singapore), Hong Kong University of Science & Technology (Hong Kong), University of California, Davis (United States).

== See also ==
- Institut Catholique de Paris
- Edouard Branly
