= European School of Political and Social Sciences =

The European School of Political and Social Sciences
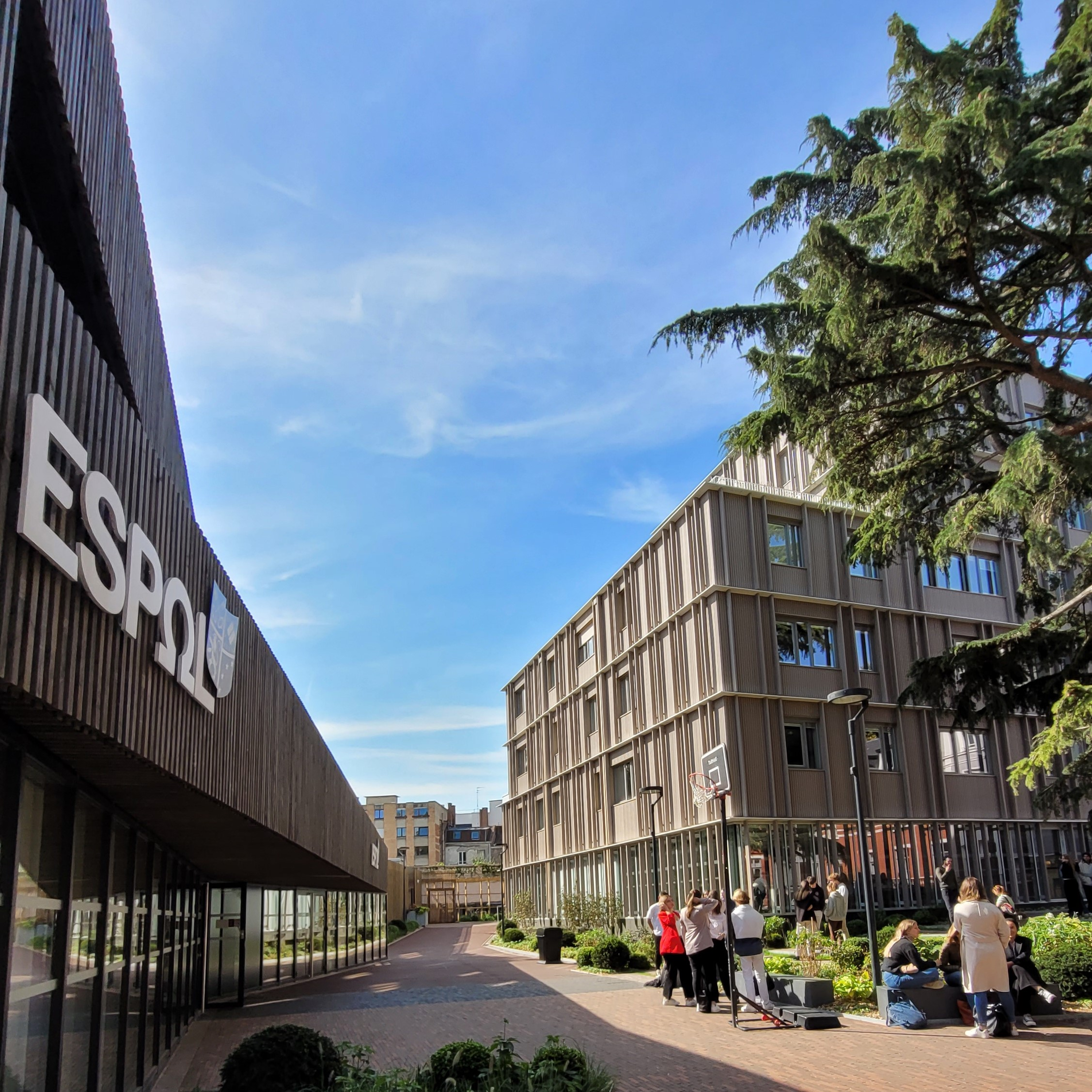
- Photo of ESPOL's Campus, in Lille in 2022
- Other name: ESPOL
- Type: Private higher education
- Established: 2012
- Parent institution: Lille Catholic University
- Affiliations: European Consortium for Political Research; Couperin
- Director: Andrew Glencross
- Location: Lille, Hauts-de-France, France; 50.631317°N 3.045904°E
- Campus: Urban
- Language: French and English
- Website: www.espol-lille.eu

The European School of Political and Social Sciences (referred to as ESPOL) is a non-profit private higher education institution located in Lille, France, and a member institution of Lille Catholic University, France's largest private university.

Founded in 2012, ESPOL is dedicated to the study and research of political and social sciences, and awards state-recognized bachelors and master's.

== Campus ==
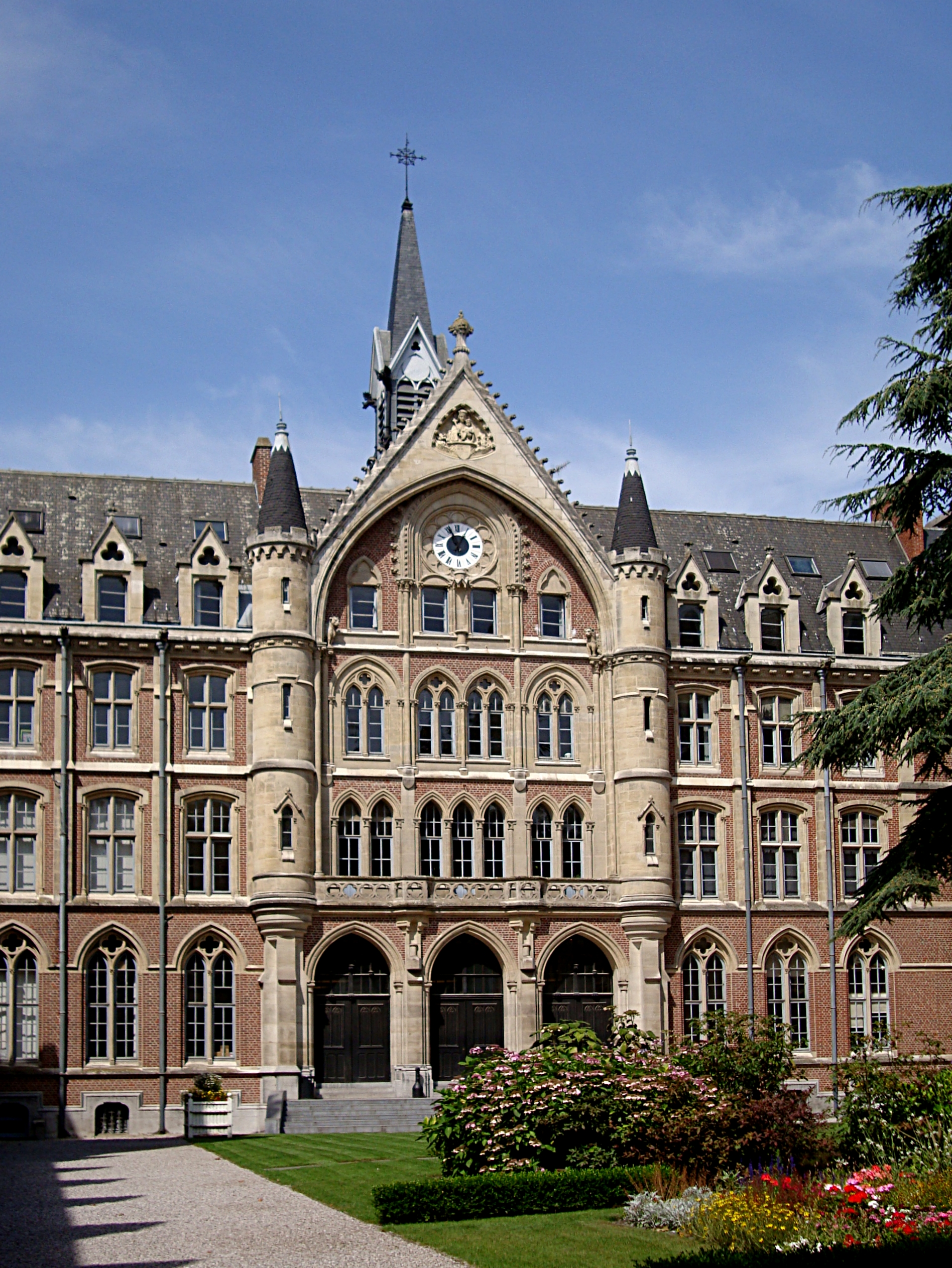
Lille Catholic University – Academic hall

ESPOL is based in the Vauban neighborhood in Lille, Hauts-de-France, France, on the premises of Lille Catholic University's campus, and within walking distance to the Citadel of Lille.

In 2019 and 2022, ESPOL inaugurated two new buildings on its campus, dedicated to housing administrative offices, several amphitheaters, and a classroom inspired by the House of Commons.

The development completed in 2022 formed part of the redevelopment of the Saint-Raphaël campus. Designed by Wonk Architectes, with engineering services provided by MODUO, the project combined the construction of a teaching building with the renovation of an adjoining mansion. The new building includes classrooms, student common areas, offices for teaching and administrative staff, and a 240-seat underground lecture theatre. The renovation of the adjoining property increased the available accommodation and provided an additional entrance to the campus's green space.

The project formed part of Lille Catholic University's Live Tree programme for the energy transition of its campus. Its design incorporated low-carbon concrete, photovoltaic panels and planted areas. The construction combined timber and concrete, with facilities including a library, a cafeteria, shared working areas and outdoor spaces.

=== Transport ===
The nearest Lille Metro stations are Gambetta and Cormontaigne.

== Education ==
=== Admission ===
Admission to ESPOL is competitive: for undergraduate programmes the admission rate ranges from 10 to 20%. All undergraduate applications are made through Parcoursup, the online admission platform hosted by the Ministry of Higher Education, Research and Innovation. In 2016–17, entry qualifications of first-year undergraduate students averaged 14.74 (out of a possible 20) in the French Baccalauréat. In 2024, 6400 students applied for an undergraduate program.

Postgraduate students at ESPOL are required to have an undergraduate level degree (180 ECTS) at the time of entry and provide proof of English language proficiency. Master's applications are made through the university's admission platform. The admission rate ranges from 10 to 15%.

In the 2021–22 academic year, ESPOL had a domicile breakdown of 81:19 of French:non-French students respectively in the undergraduate programmes, of 30:70 of French:non-French students respectively in the master's programmes, and with a female to male ratio of 71:29. In the same year, 20% of ESPOL students were scholarship holders.

Tuition fees at ESPOL vary according to household income, household composition and a needs-based evaluation index. Tuition fees for both bachelors and masters range from 2885 € to 9500 €. Merit-based scholarships are also available, ranging from €1000 to €2000.

=== Programmes and degrees ===
The School offers 3 bachelor's degrees and 4 master's degrees. Its bachelor's programmes are bilingual (French/English) whereas its master's programmes are taught only in English.

==== Bachelor's degrees ====
- Bachelor's degree in European Political Science and European Affairs
- Bachelor's degree in International Relations
- Bachelor's degree in Philosophy, Politics and Economics

==== Master's degrees ====
- Master's degree in Global and European Politics
- Master's degree in Food Politics and Sustainable Development
- Master's degree in International and Security Politics
- Master's degree in Digital Politics and Governance

=== Library ===
ESPOL students have access to the BU Vauban network of 9 libraries: 6 in Lille, 2 in Paris and 1 in Nice, totalling 400,000 books. The library network is a member of Couperin, a consortium representing more than 250 academic institutions in France, which facilitates and negotiates access to academic journals, databases, e-books and other online resources offered by academic publishers.

=== Public lectures and guest speakers ===
Recent prominent speakers at the school have included Raphaël Glucksmann, Michel Sapin, Thomas J. Biersteker, Christian de Boissieu, Cyril Dion, Bernard Kouchner, Chantal Mouffe, Karima Delli, Jeremy Rifkin, Aurélien Pradié, Gilles Pargneaux, Luuk van Middelaar, Violette Spillebout, Johan C. Verbeke, Muhammad Yunus, Vadim Omelchenko and Pierre-Yves Neron.

=== Research ===
ESPOL boasts a special research centre known as ESPOL-LAB.

The research at ESPOL-LAB is structured around three primary areas:

1. The Quality of Democracy: Investigating the quality of democratic systems and governance.
2. Reconfigurations of the International: Analyzing changing dynamics in international relations.
3. Politics of the Anthropocene: Exploring political responses to the challenges of the Anthropocene era.

Europe serves as a central theme cutting across all these research areas, influencing and shaping investigations.

=== Partnerships ===
ESPOL has established academic partnerships in teaching and research with 140 universities worldwide. These partnerships facilitate student exchange programs, allowing ESPOL students to study for a semester at partner schools, while students from these schools also have the opportunity to study at ESPOL for a semester. These universities include:

- in Europe: University College Dublin, University of Groningen, Charles University, University of Tartu, Liverpool Hope University, University of Erfurt, Queen's University Belfast, University of Southern Denmark, Charles III University of Madrid, University of Giessen, University of Florence, Galatasaray University, European University of Madrid, Kaunas University of Technology.
- in North America: Villanova University, Université de Montréal, Catholic University of America, University of Monterrey, North Carolina State University, University of San Francisco, University of Memphis, University of Alberta, University of Ottawa, Universidad Iberoamericana.
- in South America: Latin American Social Sciences Institute, Pontifical Catholic University of Rio de Janeiro, Pontifical Catholic University of Argentina, Universidade de Ribeirão Preto, Universidad Mayor, Pontifical Catholic University of Chile, Del Rosario University, Pontificia Universidad Católica del Ecuador, Federico Santa María Technical University, Peruvian University of Applied Sciences
- in Asia: Fudan University, Waseda University, American University of Central Asia, University of Macau, Wenzao Ursuline University of Languages, East China Normal University, Handong Global University, Myongji University, University of Seoul, Josai International University.

== Student life ==
=== Students' union ===
There are over 30 student clubs under the umbrella of the ESPOL students' union, including ESPOMUN, the Model United Nations delegation, the Alumni network, the debating society Le Serment d'ESPOL, ESPOL DEFENSE dedicated to promoting the diversity of defense and security professions, the Bureau Des Arts in charge of artistic activities, and Le Bureau des Médias, the school's student newspaper. The student life is coordinated by the BDE, changing every year, and sporting activity is coordinated by the ESPOL sports office (BDS, Bureau des Sports), with two exceptions, with the sailing club Vent d'ESPOL and the petanque club named Le cochonnet Espolien.
