= Christian de Boissieu =

French professor of economics

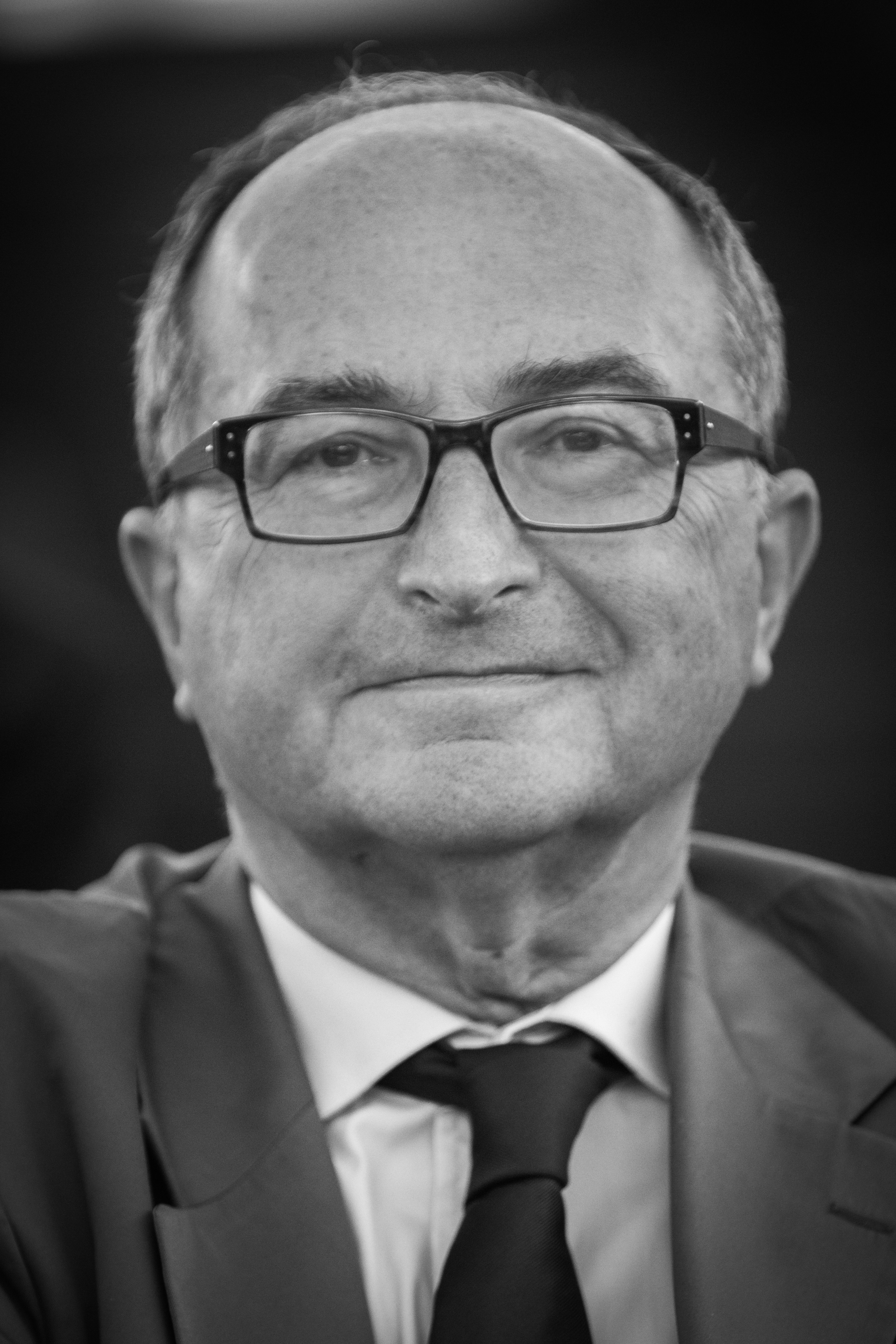
- Christian de Boissieu in 2013
- Born: 18 March 1947 (age 79); Boulogne-Billancourt, France
- Education: Lycée Montaigne; Sciences Po; Panthéon-Sorbonne University
- Occupation: Economist
- Relatives: Pierre de Boissieu (brother)

Christian de Boissieu (born 18 March 1947) is a French professor of economics at Pantheon-Sorbonne University, Paris.

== Biography ==
Christian de Boissieu received a Ph.D. in economics in 1973 at the University of Paris-I Panthéon-Sorbonne. He was post-doctoral fellow at Harvard University and Northwestern University (1973–74), and visiting scholar at the University of Minnesota (1978) and at the Board of Governors of the Federal Reserve System (1982).

He is currently professor at Pantheon-Sorbonne University, where he is the director of the famous master's degree in Banking and Finance, and also teaches at the European School of Political and Social Sciences in Lille. Moreover, he taught at the College of Europe of Bruges (1999–2004).

He was consultant to the World Bank and to the European Commission, and has been in charge of a TACIS program mission in Russia on domestic arrears, monetary policy and banking regulation. He is also economic adviser to the Paris Chamber of Commerce and Industry, and member of the "Conseil National du Crédit", "Comité des Etablissements de Crédit et des Entreprises d'Investissement" (CECEI) and of the "Comité de la Réglementation Bancaire et Financière". He is honorary President of the French Finance Association and of the Société d'Economie Politique.

He was a member of the advisory board of J.P. Morgan (France) and member of the advisory board of Ernst & Young (France).

From 2003, he has been president of the Conseil d'Analyse Économique attached to the French Prime Minister.

He has published many books and articles in the field of monetary analysis and economic policy. He is a regular columnist for Le Figaro, Le Monde and Les Échos.

== Publications ==
- Banking in France, Routledge, London 1990
- Les mutations de l'économie française, Economica, Paris 1997
- Monnaie et Economie, Economica, Paris 1998
- Les mutations de l'économie mondiale, Economica, Paris 2000
- Les Entreprises Françaises 2001, Economica, Paris 2001
- Les Entreprises Françaises 2002, Economica, Paris 2002
- Les normes comptables et le monde post-Enron, La Documentation Française, 2003
- Les systèmes financiers. Mutations, Crises et Régulation, Economica Paris 2004
- Les Entreprises Françaises 2004, Economica, Paris 2004
- Economie contemporaine, Tome 2, Les phénomènes monétaires (with Denise Flouzat), Presses Universitaires de France, 2004
