= IÉSEG School of Management =

French graduate business school in Lille, France

- Institut d'Économie Scientifique et de Gestion
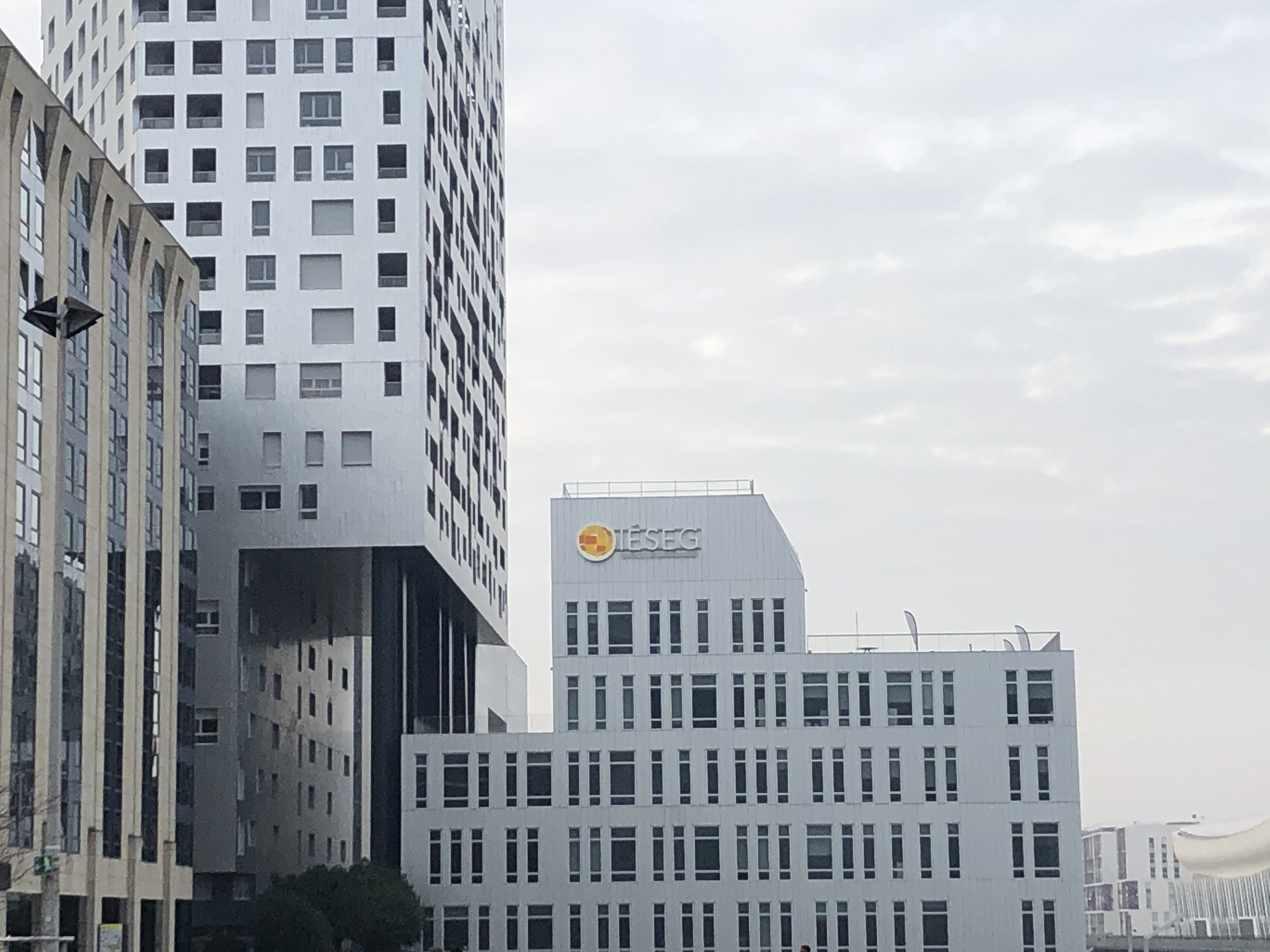
- Motto: Empowering changemakers for a better society
- Type: Grande école de commerce et de management (Private research university Business school)
- Established: 1964; 62 years ago
- Accreditation: Triple accreditation: AACSB; AMBA; EQUIS
- Academic affiliations: Conférence des Grandes écoles
- Budget: €71 million (2019)
- President: Marc Delozanne
- Dean: Caroline Roussel
- Academic staff: 175 permanent professors 100% PhD.; 46% female; 88% international
- Students: 7,000
- Location: Lille, France. Paris, France
- Language: English-only & French-only instruction
- Colors: Blue; Yellow
- Website: https://www.ieseg.fr/en/
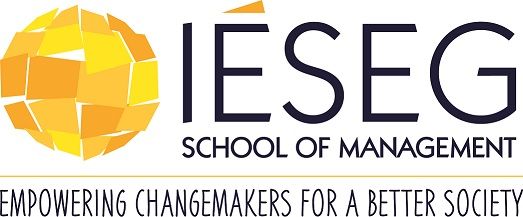

Two IÉSEG campuses in France

IÉSEG School of Management (Institut d'Économie Scientifique Et de Gestion, translated to "The Institute of Scientific Economics and Management") is a French grande école, private and graduate business school, established in 1964 in Lille, France. IÉSEG School of Management is a member of the private Université Catholique de Lille consortium, the largest private university in France in terms of student population and endowment. The school has two campuses, one in Lille and one in Paris. IÉSEG holds the "Triple Crown" of international business school accreditations: EQUIS, AACSB, and AMBA.

As of the 2019/2020 academic year, the school has more than 9,000 alumni, 7000 students on the Lille and Paris campuses, 2,600 of which are international students representing more than 100 nationalities.

The School has more than 700 professors; 82% of its permanent faculty is international, 100% hold a PhD and it has a network of more than 300 partner universities in 75 countries and over 2500 company partners.

== History ==
Institut d'Économie Scientifique et de Gestion (IÉSEG Lille) was founded in 1964 in Lille by the economist and former dean of the Université Catholique de Lille, Michel Falise. In 1976, the private school was recognized by the Ministry of National Education (France) and became member of the Conférence des Grandes écoles in 1997. In 2002, IESEG was one of the first business schools in France which started to propose a Master in management fully taught in english.

From 2006, IESEG started to collaborate with the CNRS in a shared laboratory and is since then, one of the business schools in France with HEC Paris and others to have this agreement. In 2012, the school received the EQUIS accreditation, in 2013 the AACSB and in 2013 AMBA.

In recent years, IESEG chose to not develop overseas campuses but instead, to develop the Lille and Paris campuses. In contrary to most colleges and universities in France, the Lille campus is accessible 24 hours a day, 7 days a week.

== Grande École System ==
IÉSEG School of Management is a Grande école, a French institution of higher education that is separate from, but parallel and connected to the main framework of the French public university system. Similar to the Ivy League in the United States, Oxbridge in the UK, and C9 League in China, Grandes Écoles are elite academic institutions that admit students through an extremely competitive process. Alums go on to occupy elite positions within government, administration, and corporate firms in France.

Although they are more expensive than public universities in France, Grandes Écoles typically have much smaller class sizes and student bodies, and many of their programs are taught in English. International internships, study abroad opportunities, and close ties with government and the corporate world are a hallmark of the Grandes Écoles. Many of the top ranked business schools in Europe are members of the Conférence des Grandes Écoles (CGE), as is IÉSEG, and out of the 250 business schools in France, only 39 are CGE members.

Degrees from IÉSEG are accredited by the Conférence des Grandes Écoles and awarded by the Ministry of National Education (France) (French: Le Ministère de L'éducation Nationale). IÉSEG is further accredited by the elite international business school accrediting organizations and it holds the much coveted Triple accreditation: The European Foundation for Management Development (EQUIS), The Association to Advance Collegiate Schools of Business (AACSB), and Association of MBAs (AMBA) In 2022, the Financial Times ranked its Masters in Management program 26th in the world.

== Programs ==
Higher education business degrees in France are organized into three levels thus facilitating international mobility: the Licence/Bachelor's, Master's, and Doctorate degrees. A Bachelor's degree requires the completion of 180 ECTS credits (bac+3); a Master's, requires an additional 120 ECTS credits (bac+5). The highly coveted PGE (Program Grand École) ends with the awarding of Master's in Management (M.M.) degree. Outside of the PGE, students at IÉSEG can be awarded other Master's degrees, such as the MBA (bac + 5)

== International ==
=== Exchange program ===
IÉSEG has more than 300 partner universities around the world (in 75 different countries) including: - Harvard University - Cornell University - University of California Berkeley - University of Glasgow - University of Sheffield - IE Business School - Korea University - University of Bologna - Bocconi University - Peking University - University of Hong Kong - McGill University - Copenhagen Business School - LMU Munich - Lomonosov Moscow State University

IESEG's students can spend one or two semesters as an exchange student during their Bachelor's degree, and one or two additional semesters during the Master's degree. In addition, the School welcomes more than 2500 international students each year.

=== Dual degree ===
IESEG proposes several dual degrees, both for the Bachelor's and Master's program.

Program	Partner universities in 2021
Bachelor's degree	EBS University of Business and Law Germany Fairleigh Dickinson University United States Juniata College United States Pforzheim University Germany Universidad del Rosario Colombia Universidad Politécnica de Valencia Spain
Master's degree	Plekhanov Russian University of Economics Russia Lancaster University UK McGill University Canada Loughborough University UK Queensland University of Technology Australia Rikkyo University Japan The City University of New York United States Tongji University China Università Carlo Cattaneo Italy Lille Catholic University (Dual degree in business and law) France
Doctor of Philosophy	KU Leuven Belgium
