= Institut supérieur de l'automobile et des transports =

Graduate engineering school in France

- Type: Public, Graduate engineering
- Established: 1991
- Affiliations: Elles Bougent
- Location: Nevers, Circuit de Nevers Magny-Cours, France; 46°59′52.3″N 3°10′17.164″E
- Website: www.isat.fr

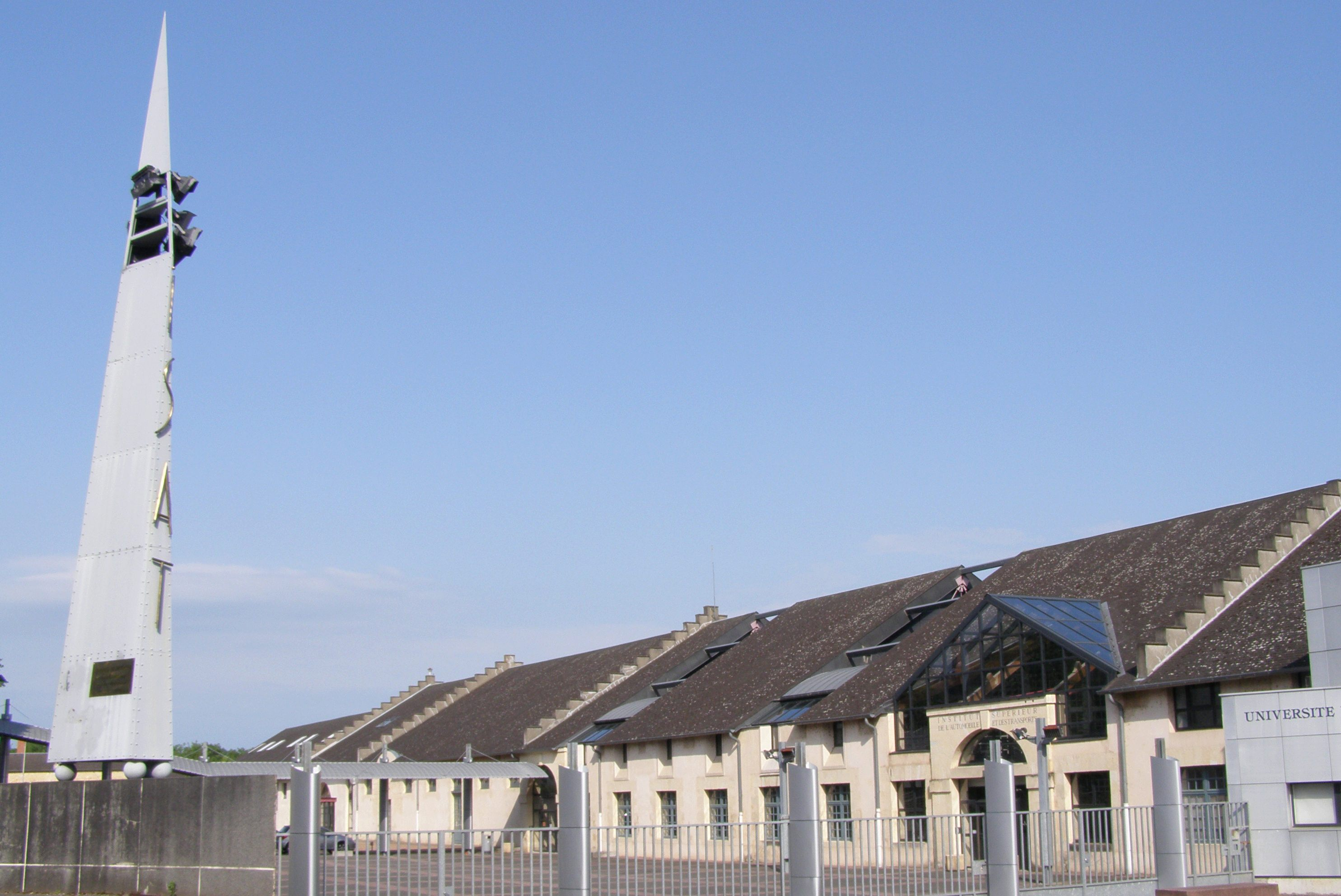
ISAT

The Institut supérieur de l'automobile et des transports is a graduate engineering school, created in 1991. It is located in the campus of the University of Burgundy. It is the only public engineering college in France specialized in automotive.

Its different curricula lead to the following French & European degrees :

- Ingénieur ISAT (ISAT Graduate engineer Masters program with EUR-ACE label)
- Master of Science

Academic activities and industrial applied research are performed mainly in French and English languages. Students from a dozen of nationalities participate to the different curricula at ISAT.

Most of the 1000 graduate engineer students at ISAT live in dedicated residential buildings nearby research labs and metro public transports.

== Research at Institut supérieur de l'automobile et des transports ==
- Energy, Propulsion and Environment
- Intelligent Vehicles
- Durability and Composite Structures
- Vibrations & Transport Acoustics.
