= Universidade de Ribeirão Preto =

Private university in São Paulo, Brazil

Logo of the University of Ribeirão Preto

The University of Ribeirão Preto (UNAERP) is a higher education and technology center in the state of São Paulo. It is a private institution, supported financially by student fees. Student adherence takes place through national entrance exams such as ENEM and also through exams carried out by AERP (Ribeirão Preto Teaching Association). It has two campuses within the state, the first being in the city of foundation (Ribeirão Preto), and the other in the coastal city of Guaruja.

== History ==
The University of Ribeirão Preto was the first institution of higher education in the Ribeirão Preto region. It was founded on June 1, 1924, as the "Society School Pharmácia and Ribeirão Preto Dental School" by a group of idealistic health professionals, intellectuals and educators. The establishment of the university aimed to promote the social, educational and cultural development of the area.

In the 1920s, Ribeirão Preto presented itself as one of the most prosperous areas in the state of São Paulo. The wealth generated by the production of coffee led to the region attracting migrants from various parts of the country and immigrants from abroad, including a significant number of Italians.

It was against this background in 1928 that the Ribeirão Preto Education Association (AERP) was founded. Today the AERP maintains the UNAERP and has consolidated it into an institution with strong academic tradition.

In 1959, Professor Electro Bonini (1913–2011) took over the administration of the AERP. During this period the university underwent a large expansion and implemented new courses. In 1961, the Faculty of Law, Laudo de Camargo, was established as well as courses in Social Services, Industrial Chemistry and Business Administration. In the 70s, the AERP also offered the Social Communication courses, Physical Education, Chemical Engineering, Fine Arts, Arts Education, Music alongside other degree choices. To accommodate the growing range of subjects taught by the university, a new campus was opened in 1971 in the Ribeirânia neighborhood of the city, covering an area of 120 thousand square meters. Alongside campus expansion, the university introduced more study programs.

In 1985, the university was officially named as the University of Ribeirão Preto. Simultaneously, Professor Elmara Lucia de Oliveira Bonini assumed the role of dean. Under her leadership, the university invested in research in fields such as speech therapy, computer engineering, tourism, nursing, and various areas of social, health, environmental, and biotechnology studies. These investments continued to grow into the following decade, leading to the expansion of course offerings and the development of research projects and services for the population. In 1999, a campus was established in Guaruja a coastal city in São Paulo. The campus opened in June of that year and adhered to the same philosophy of integrating with social and regional economic demands.

== Courses ==
Today, the UNAERP is one of the largest educational centers in the state of São Paulo and has undergraduate and postgraduate courses in technology, health, and sciences. UNAERP also conducts 30 extension programs in clinics, laboratories, and in hospitals.

== Ranking ==
In 2019 UNAERP was ranked in the top 200 universities in Latin America.
