= Université catholique de Lille =

Catholic university in northern France

Coordinates: 50°38′0″N 3°2′46″E

Catholic University of Lille
- Université catholique de Lille
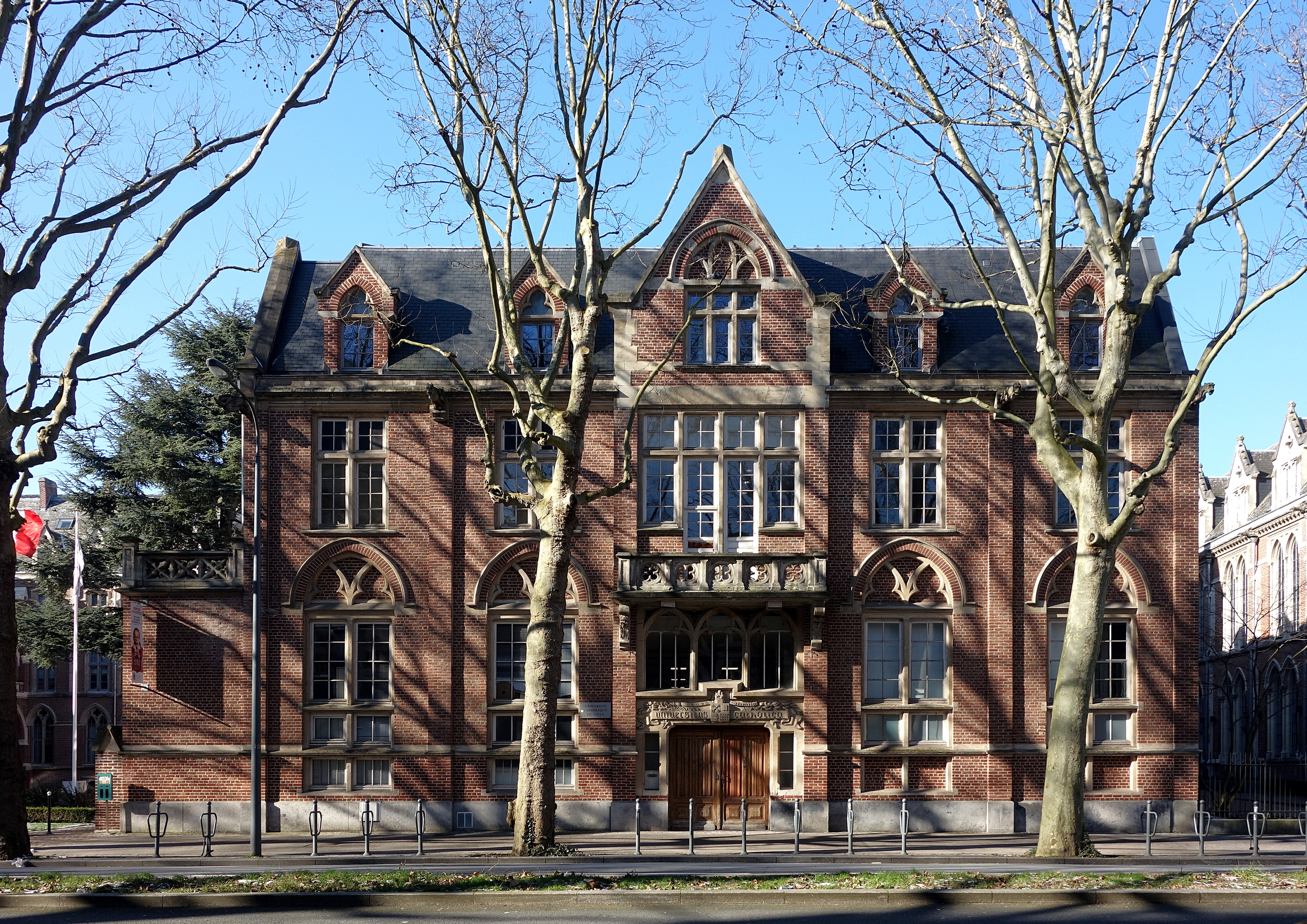
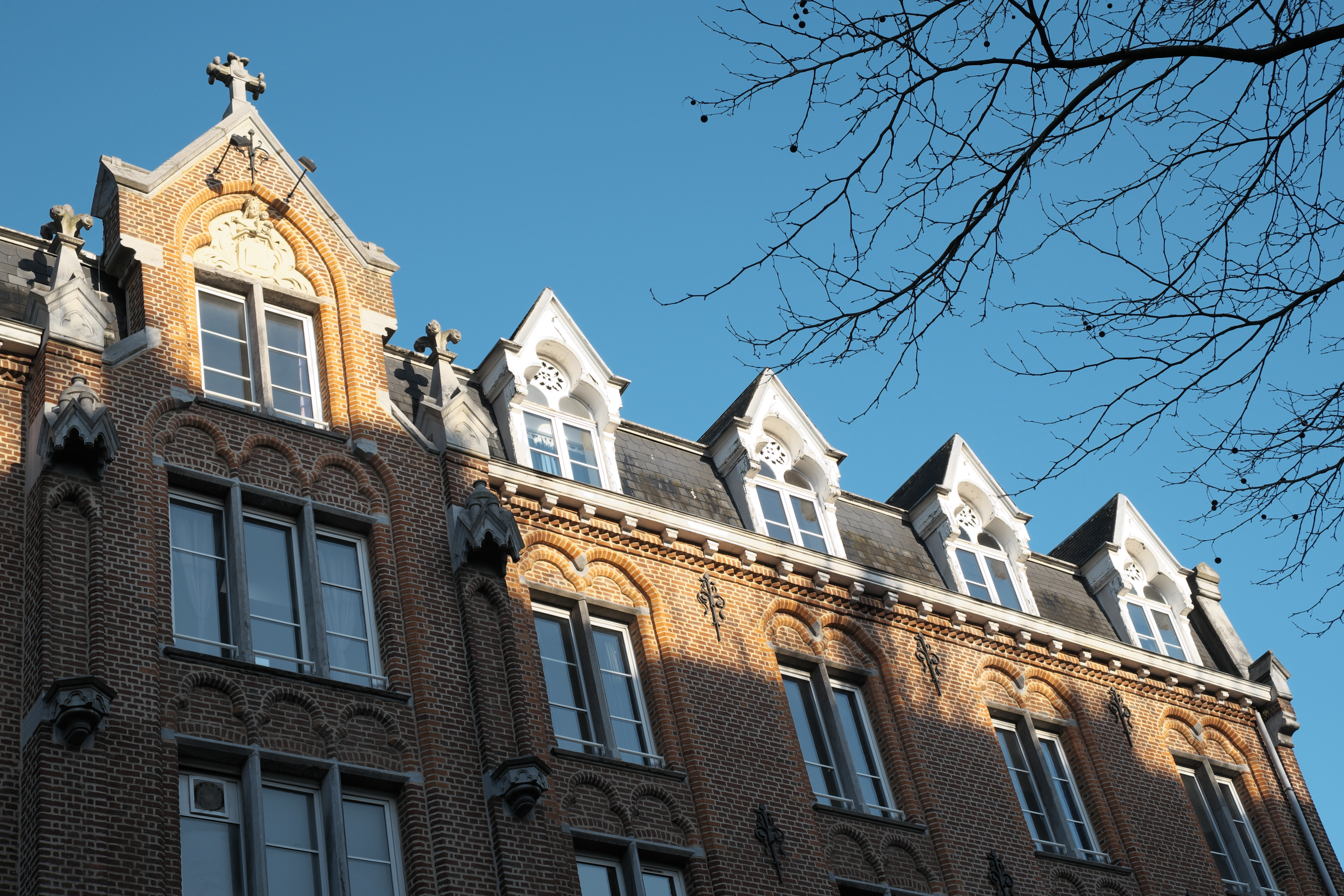
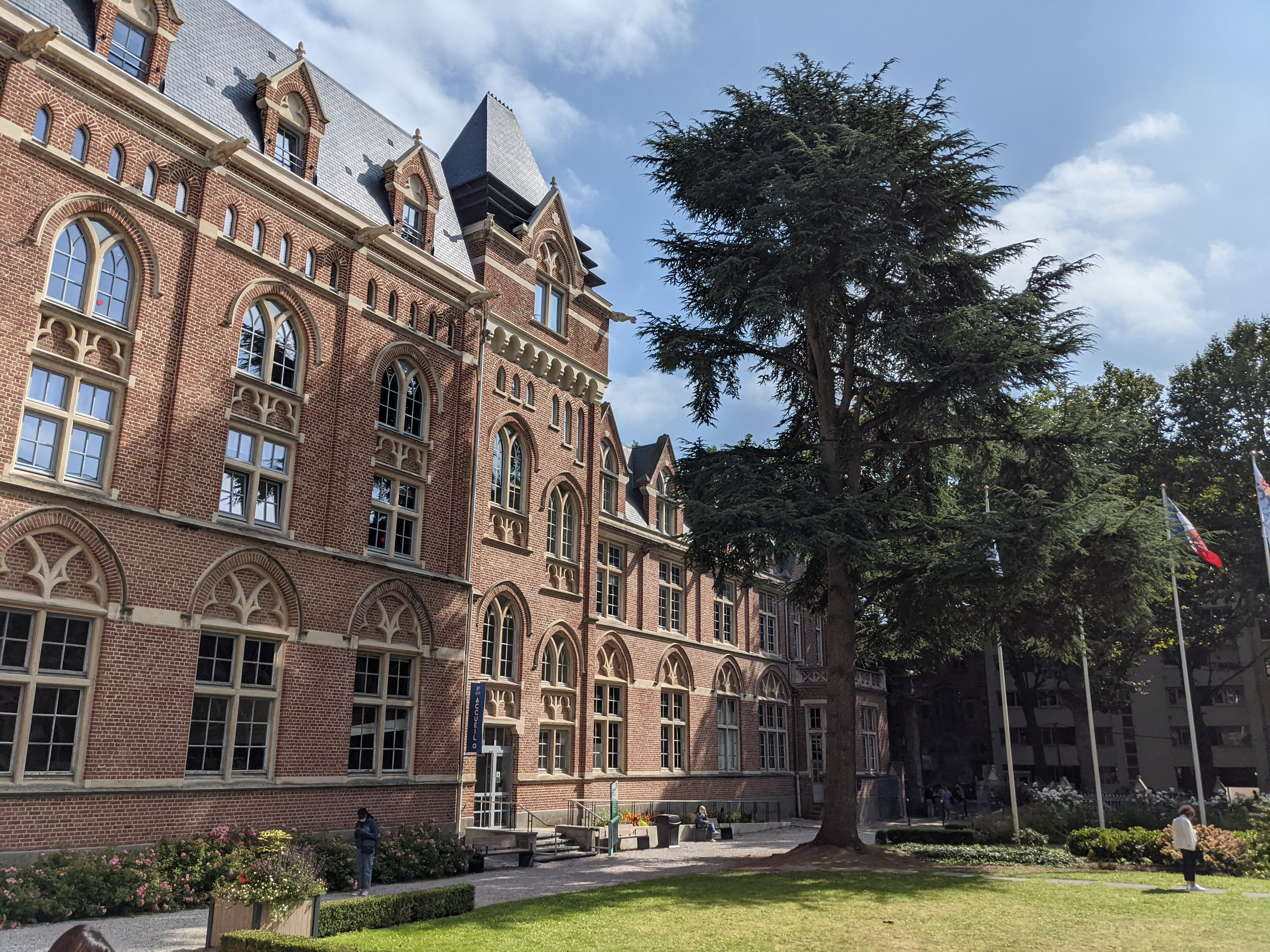
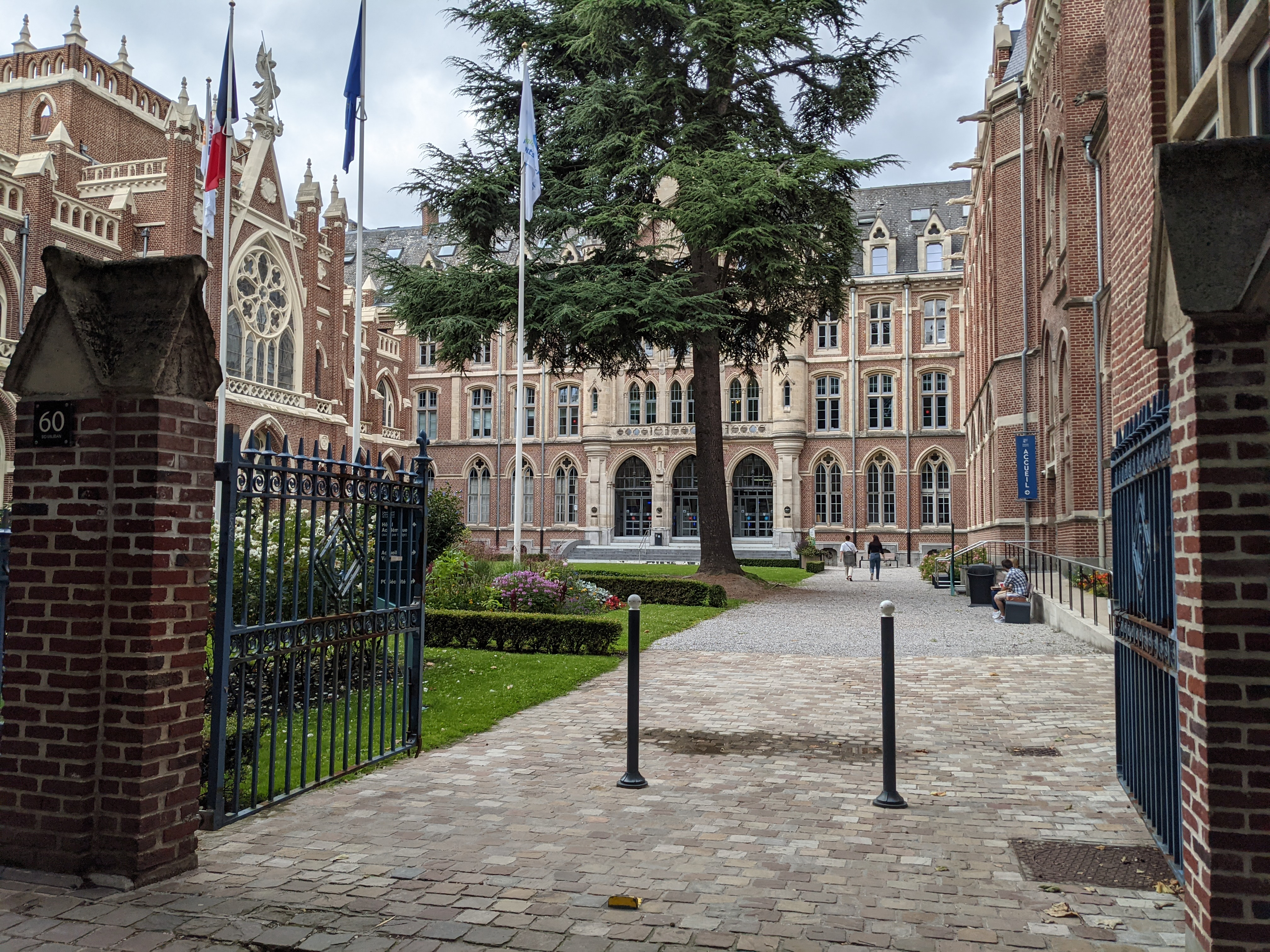
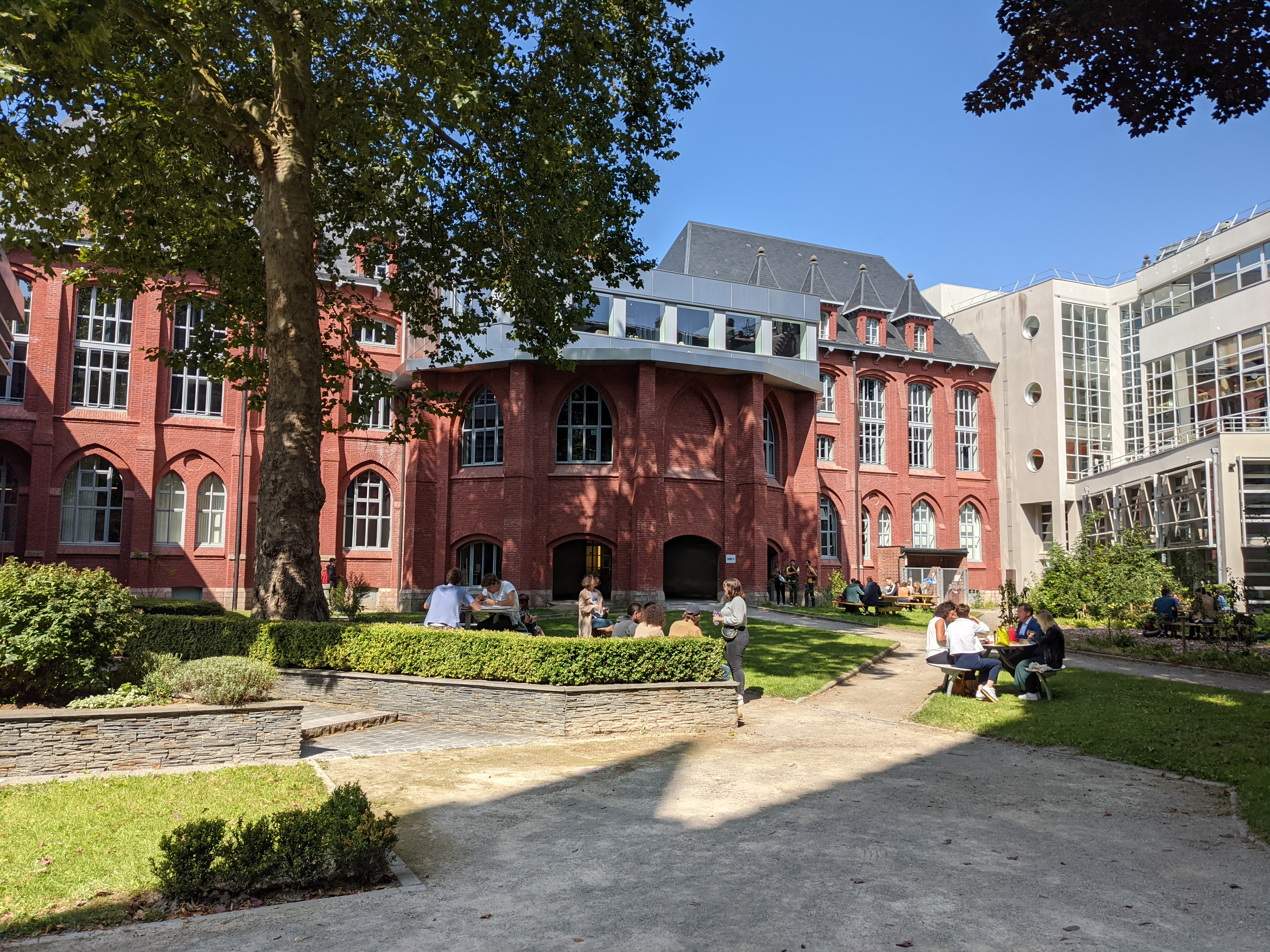
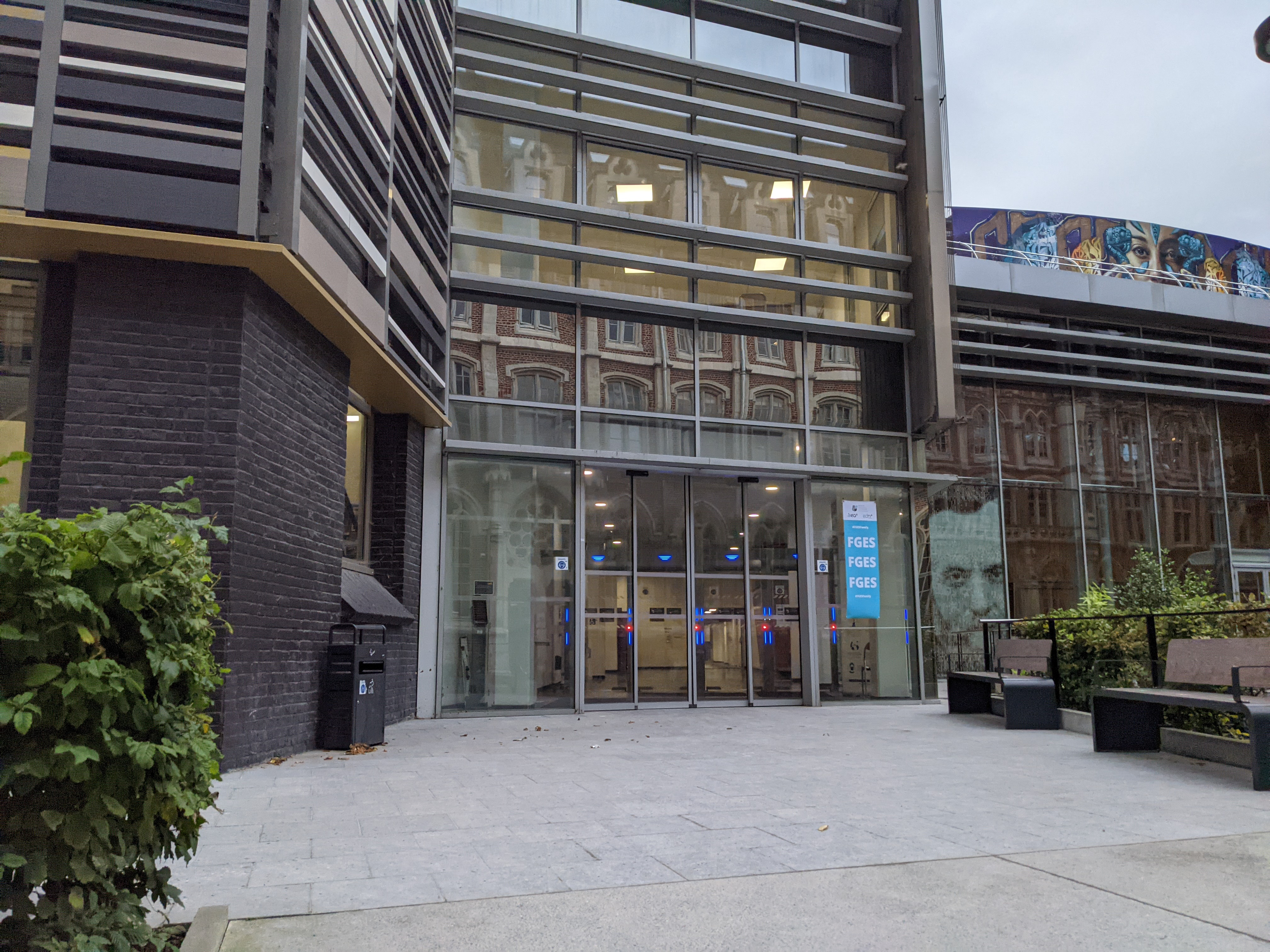
- Coat of arms
- Latin: Universitas Catholica Insulensis
- Motto: In fide ad scientam (Latin)
- Motto in English: In faith, to knowledge
- Type: Private
- Established: 1875; 151 years ago
- Affiliations: International Federation of Catholic Universities, Union of Catholic Higher Education Institutions (UDESCA)
- Religious affiliation: Roman Catholicism
- Chancellor: Laurent le Boulc'h
- President-Rector: Patrick Scauflaire
- Students: 40 000 (2022)
- Location: Lille, Hauts-de-France, France
- Campus: Urban (10ha)
- Founder: Philibert Vrau
- Website: univ-catholille.fr
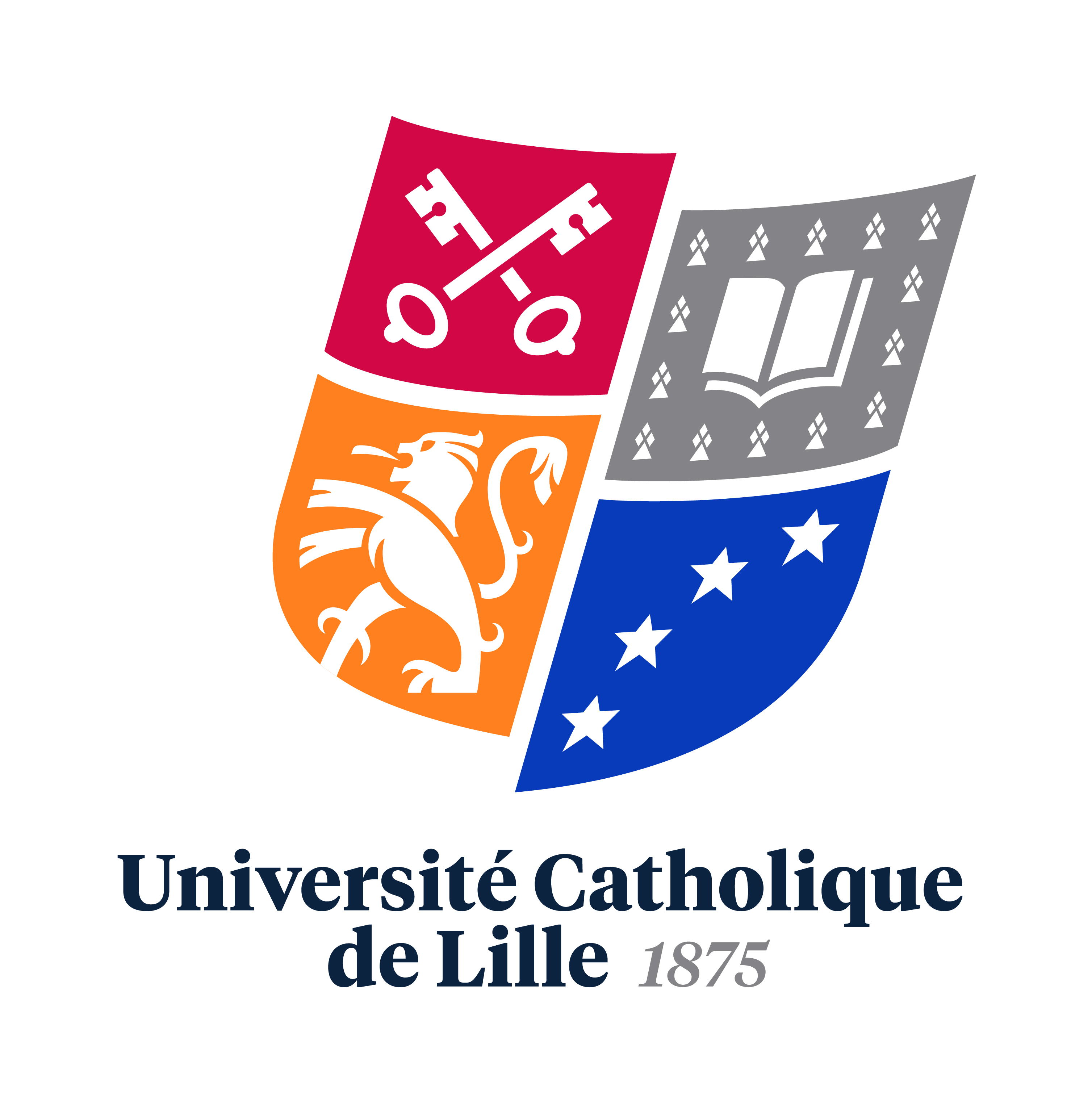

The Catholic University of Lille (in French: "Université catholique de Lille"), commonly known as the "Catho" and officially the Fédération Universitaire et Pluridisciplinaire de Lille (according to its statutes), is a private university organized as an federation of colleges of Catholic inspiration, founded in 1875 and located in Lille, France.

It is associated with the Polytechnic University of Hauts-de-France, research centres and a hospital group. Together, these institutions will have more than 36,700 students in 2021.

Until 2019, the Catholic University of Lille was a partner in the University of Lille Nord de France initiative of excellence led by the University of Lille. On 1 March 2022, the decree n°2022-304 associating the Catholic University of Lille with the Polytechnic University of Hauts-de-France was published.

== History ==
The year of the Wallon Law of 12 July 1875 freeing up higher education, the Catholic University of Lille was founded by a committee of lay Ultramontanes including Philibert Vrau, "embarrassed" by the absence of such a structure in Lille while public schools were established in Lille since 1854. This was amidst a national debate on secularism before the church-state separation in France.

The Faculty of Medicine was created in 1876 and the College of Theology in 1877. The official inauguration took place on 15 January 1877, upon receipt of the papal bull which gave the Catholic University of Lille canonical status.

== Coat of arms ==
The coat of arms was developed during the founding period, the 1870s. It highlights the institution's academic and ecclesial character, the tradition in which it is rooted, and the part played by the two northern provinces in its creation. It has four sections.

- The first offers a gules field with two keys in saltire: these are the weapons of the ancient Collège Saint-Pierre de Lille and Lille Cathedral, which represented the university's origins and union with the Chair of Peter.
- The second section is an ermine field with open book, distinguishing symbols of the science doctorate.
- The third section represents the Lion of Flanders.
- The fourth is a recent change, the starry field of flag of Europe.

== Structure ==
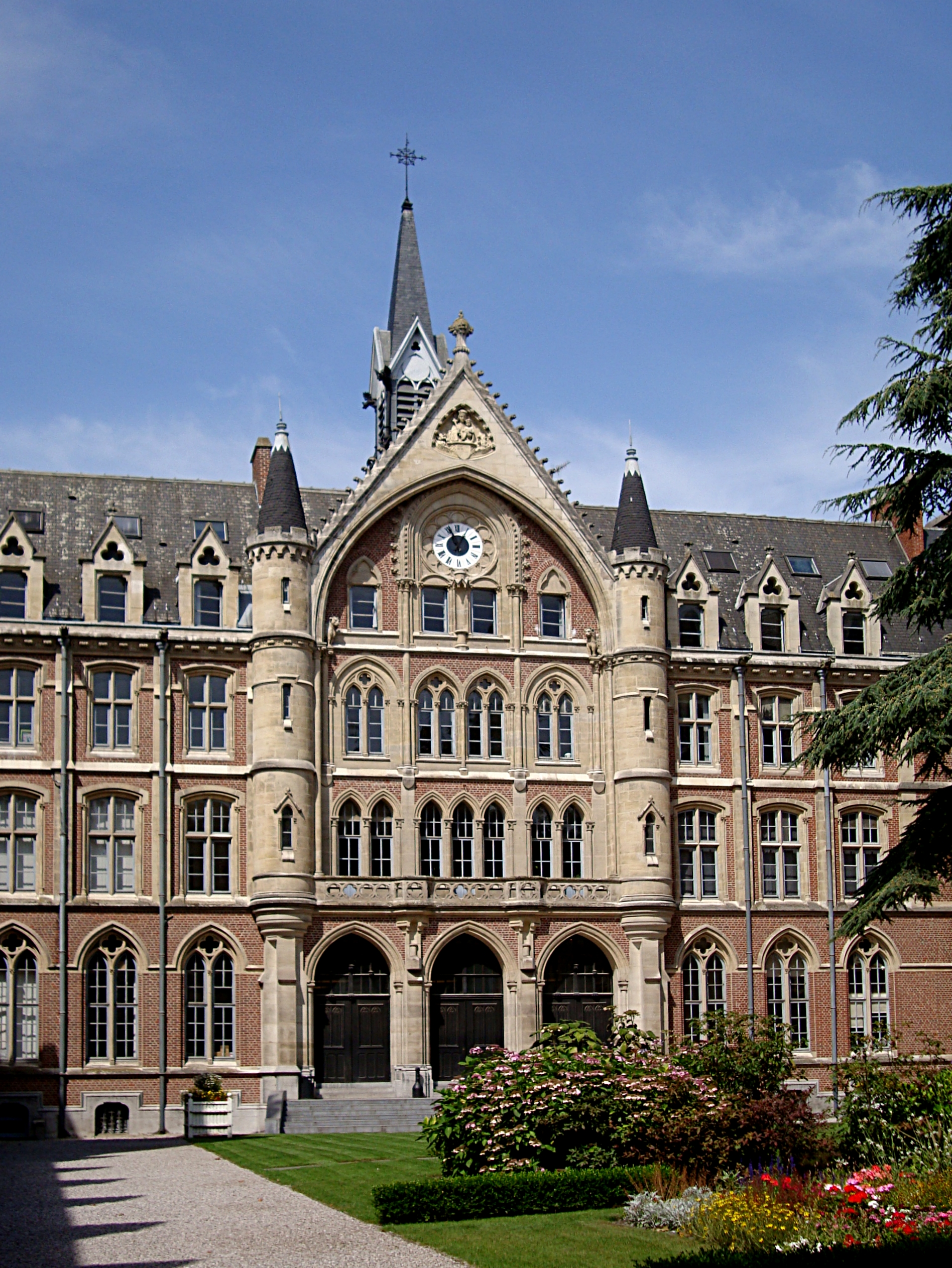

The Catholic University of Lille includes:

- the Faculties of the Catholic University of Lille, a private institute of higher education with five faculties:
  - the Faculty of Law (FLD);
  - the Faculty of Medicine and Obstetrics (FMM);
  - the Faculty of Business, Economics, and Sciences (FGES);
  - the Faculty of Arts and Humanities (FLSH);
  - the Faculty of Theology
- twenty schools and institutes, with the Junia engineering schools (HEI, ISA, ISEN) and ICAM;
- 3 transversal institutes;
- a hospital group, the Hospital Group at UCL (GHICL), the CMP Cross;
- about 40 research teams (400 research professors and 140 PhD students);
- the Vauban University Library, created in partnership with EDHEC, the ESPEME, the IÉSEG, the Faculty of Business, Economics, and Sciences, the Faculty of Arts and Humanities, and the Faculty of Law, 12 area libraries, a digital library network (BNR);
- a sports center of 7 hectors, established at Ennetières-en-Weppes.

Its campus, which covers 10 hectares in the city, includes 2000 student rooms on campus, chaplaincy, and a cultural center.

The Catholic University of Lille is chaired by Patrick Scauflaire since September 2020. His administration is composed of several boards and commissions: the University Council, Supervisory Board, and the board including the bishops of Arras, Cambrai, and Lille. There are also five Advisory Committees (e.g., the Cultural Commission).

The federation has 25,500 students in 2014 (including 6500 in faculties) with more than 2600 international students, from at least 120 countries. Overall, this corresponds to 4500 graduates per year, including 635 engineers. The teaching staff consists of 1,000 permanent and 2,500 temporary lecturers.

The Catholic University of Lille is a founding member of the public ComUE (Commonwealth of Universities and Institutions of Lille Nord de France), University of Lille Nord de France.

The areas of study are Law, Economics, Management; Science and Technology; Arts, Humanities, Theology and Religious Studies, Ethics; Health and Social Care.

== Faculties ==
The faculties are :

- the Faculty of Law (FLD);
- the Faculty of Medicine and Obstetrics (FMM);
- the Faculty of Business, Economics, and Sciences (FGES);
- the Faculty of Arts and Humanities (FLSH);
- the Faculty of Theology (FT).

== Schools and institutes ==
=== Law, economics, management ===
- EDHEC Business School
- International Business School (ESTICE)
- IESEG School of Management
- Institute of Communication Strategies and Techniques (ISTC)
- European School of Political and Social Sciences (ESPOL)
- Higher Institute of Expertise and Audit (ISEA), school of GHEF

=== Science and technology ===
- The private graduate school of the application of science (ESPAS)
- HEI – higher engineering studies
- The Catholic Institute of Arts and Crafts (ICAM)
- Higher Institute of Electronics and Digital (ISEN), general engineering of new technologies
- Higher Institute of Agriculture (ISA Lille), agriculture, food, environment, agricultural economics, landscape

=== Humanities & theology ===
- International Institute of Faith, Art and Catechesis (IIFAC)
- Institute of Philosophy

=== Education and training ===
- IFP, preparing the teaching profession

=== Health and welfare ===
- IFSANTÉ, Institute of Nursing Education (nurse, caregiver, childcare, health framework)
- ICM, medical communication
- IFMK, physiotherapy
- IFPP, podiatry and chiropody
- IKPO, physiotherapy, orthopedics and podiatry
- ISL, Lille Social Institute
- IU2S, Social Health University Institute

=== Associated high schools ===
- Frédéric Ozanam private high school, preparatory classes for the integrated ICAM
- Private high school St. Paul
- Private school Our Lady of Peace
- Private school Our Lady of Grace (AUM)
- La Salle school complex Lille
- Private Lycée Saint – Jude
- Technical private school St. Luke – Wisdom

== Research ==
In 2014, the research activity of the Catholic University of Lille included nearly 440 teachers and researchers and 130 doctoral students (enrolled in the PhD Doctoral Schools Public University), which corresponds approximately to 240 ETP research. This workforce is spread over fifty research units in disciplines as diverse as nanoscience, psychology, economics, law, or theology. Some Catho research units are labeled and carried under joint supervision with public universities. These are of two mixed units: CNRS (LEM - UMR 8179, IEMN - UMR 8520) and two host teams (EA - LGCgE, EA - L2EP). There is also a Clinical Research Center. And the medical school maintains a center for Economic Geology, Jardin botanique Nicolas Boulay.

For about ten years, Lille Catholic University institutions worked at structuring and strengthening their research activity. At the federation level, this focused on the organization of research, with the appointment of a Vice-president for Research – Cailliez Jean-Charles (2003–2012) and Nicolas Vaillant (2012 - ) – and the creation of a research council of the University. This organization induced structuring of research areas covered by the centers and the faculty of the federation, fostering the emergence of major cross-cutting themes. They share concern for the betterment of life in contemporary society: responsibilities and risks; ethics, care, and loss of autonomy; energy, housing, environment, and sustainable development; innovation, collective intelligence, and new human interactions.

== Student life ==
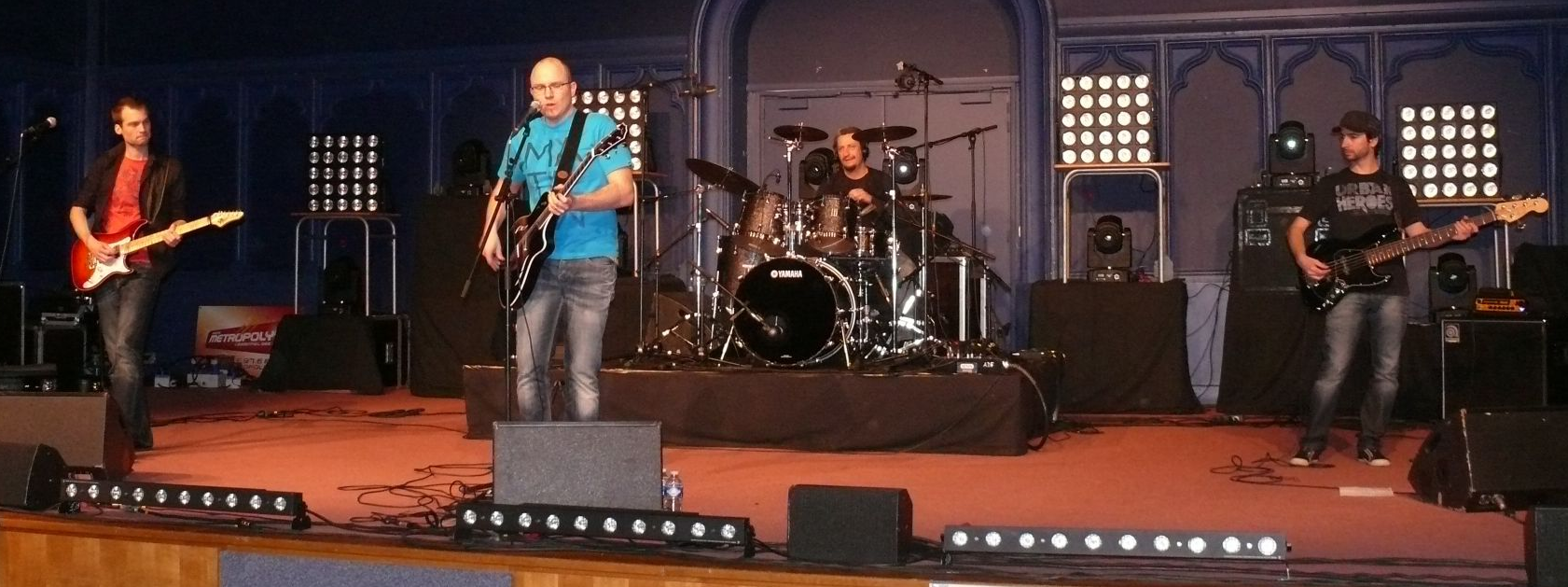
Catholic rock group P.U.S.H. performing at Catho

=== Associations ===
==== Student Federation ====
The Federation of Lille Catholic University students (or FEUCL) created in 1926 coordinates the 300 campus organizations and represents 17,000 students in the assemblies of Catho at CROUS or FAGE.

==== Association of University Support ====
The Association of University Support (AEU) manages 10 residences and Meurein restaurant serving 5000 meals a day, lunch and dinner. In addition, the Meurein restaurant has a cafeteria open to students and teachers most of the day. The AEU has been created and is administered by the FEUCL.

==== Internal associations in schools and faculties ====
Most schools and faculties have a student office (BDE) or a corporation that deals with both solidarity and culture. BDE and corporations represent their school or faculty to FEUCL. For example, ACEM (Corporate Association of Medical Students), created in 1910, lays claim to being the oldest French student corporation. In addition to the BDE and corporations, schools and faculties of Catho include associations for sports and for humanitarian, cultural, and festive events.

=== Activities ===
Students have access to sports activities through the center of Ennetières-en-Weppes of Catho or the gyms of the AEU. The university also has a cultural facility that arranges lectures, public debates, special meetings, and cultural exhibits. One of the buildings also houses a showroom. In addition to the restaurant Meurein, there's a sandwich shop, Vauban. Also, the bars and clubs of Lille, in particular in the Massena district and Henninot room, almost daily receive student parties organized by the BDE or other associations.

=== Housing ===
The AEU maintains 10 residences for students. Many students live together in the Vauban quarter or the Old Lille, giving that area of the Catho a high concentration of students and low median age.

== The Foundation of the Catholic University of Lille ==
The Foundation of the Catholic University of Lille was created under the aegis of the Fondation de France to support the general activities of the University: support for teaching and research, support of students, and heritage restoration. The foundation also awards scholarships and supports solidarity projects run by students.
