= Institut supérieur de l'électronique et du numérique =

Group of four French grandes écoles

Coordinates: 48.40705°N 4.49555°W

Higher Institute for Electronics and Digital Training
- Institut Supérieur de l'Électronique et du Numérique
- Type: Private
- Established: 1956
- Affiliations: CTI, FESIC, CGE
- Budget: €15,000,000
- President: Michel Lannoo
- Academic staff: 220 (2010)
- Students: 1.700 (2010)
- Location: (France) Lille, Toulon, Brest, Nantes, Caen, Rennes, (Morocco) Fès
- Campus: urban
- Website: Official website

The Institut supérieur de l'électronique et du numérique (ISEN; Higher Institute for Electronics and Digital Training) is a group composed of four French grandes écoles (higher education establishments). They propose a high-level engineering program in ICT (information and communication technologies), micro- and nanotechnologies, and innovative design.

== Introduction ==
The ISEN group is a consortium of four grandes écoles, the main site of which is located in Lille. The different establishments are:

- ISEN Brest (Western France)
- ISEN Nantes (Western France)
- ISEN Rennes (Western France)
- ISEN Caen (Western France)
- ISEN Lille (Northern France)
- ISEN Toulon (Southern France)
- ISEN Fès (Morocco)

The ISEN-Lille/Toulon/Brest building is attached and located on the campus. Research labs and teaching rooms are both located in the same building.

== Formations for engineer degree ==
Studies at ISEN consist of courses in electronics, computer science and computer networks, micro-electronics, and also acoustics, physics, signal processing, and telecommunications. The curriculum is covered in five or three years of studies according to the degree when entering the school. Studies are structured in bachelor's and master's levels,s but all students obtain the same degree, diplôme d’ingénieur, which is equivalent to a master's degree. Two options at the bachelor's level are offered: networks and computer science, and engineering sciences. During the last two years, each student creates a personalized syllabus, with these proposed options:

- multimedia, information systems and networks
- digital systems and applications
- project management and business development
- high technology and innovative design
- high technology and environment

The ISEN group is a member of the conférence des grandes écoles (CGE). The ISEN provides an engineering degree certified by the Ministry of Higher Education and Research and accredited by the Commission des Titres d'Ingénieur.

ISEN is in relation with universities all around the world in the field of educational exchange or research activities. Each ISEN student spends at least two months abroad during an educational exchange or an internship. International students are welcome to study in all the subjects offered by ISEN. However, Bachelor's courses are taught in French, and candidates are required to master French at the B2 level at a minimum.

== Research at ISEN ==
Research activities are recognized worldwide in all the applications of electronics: control engineering, IT, telecommunications, networking, microelectronics and nanosciences. Currently, research at ISEN consists of more than 150 researchers (30 of them being CNRS) who belong to 8 departments: physics, electronics, micro/nano-electronics, acoustics, computer science, robotics, optoelectronics, and microsystems. Furthermore, ISEN is one of the regulatory authorities of two joint research units, namely IEMN (UMR 8520 - Lille) and IM2NP (UMR 7334 – Marseille).

== Admission ==
Admission to ISEN is possible either after the baccalauréat or after two years of scientific undergraduate studies. This admission is made through a selective examination. There is, however, a further possibility to join the ISEN later on after 2 years of studies in a classe préparatoire aux grandes écoles (CPGE).

== History ==
- 1956 - ISEN is founded by Norbert Ségard
- 1960 - ISEN is accredited by the Commission des Titres d'Ingénieur
- 1991 - ISEN Toulon is founded
- 1994 - ISEN Brest is founded
- 2012 - ISEN Fes is founded
- 2016 - ISEN Nîmes is founded
- 2017 - ISEN Nantes is founded
- 2019 - ISEN Caen is founded

== Alumni ==
The ISEN alumni association AI-ISEN supports the ISEN students in finding an internship, the ISEN graduates, and organizes events. and funding campaigns for the Fondation Norbert Ségard.
