= Régis Bordet =

French Pharmacologist and President of University

- Born: 1964 (age 61–62); Boulogne-sur-Mer, France

Régis Bordet, born in 1964 in Boulogne-sur-Mer, is a French doctor and academic, author, actor and theatre director. He has been President of the University of Lille since December 2021.

== Education and career ==
=== Education ===
Régis Bordet graduated in medicine and neurology in 1993. He obtained a DEA in experimental and clinical pharmacology from the Paris-Saclay University in 1995 and a PhD in pharmacology in 1999 before defending his "habilitation to direct research" (HDR) the following year.

=== Career ===
In 1998, he was appointed Senior Lecturer at the University of Lille; in 2001, he was appointed Professor of Medical Pharmacology at the University of Lille and a hospital practitioner at Lille University Hospital.

Since 2010, he has been head of the Lille medical pharmacology department and head of the regional pharmacovigilance and addictovigilance centres. Between 2015 and 2019, he will head the INSERM U1171 unit in Lille.

In 2012, he was appointed vice-president of research at the University of Lille, before taking over as director general of the I-Site Foundation from 2018 to 2022.

=== President of the University of Lille ===
In December 2021, he succeeded Jean-Christophe Camart as head of the University of Lille for 4 years.

In April 2024, faced with the risk of a public order disturbance, he was forced to cancel a conference by Jean-Luc Mélenchon scheduled to take place at the university, which sparked debate.

== Theatre author ==
Member of the Fédération Nationale des Compagnies de Théâtre Amateur (FNCTA), Régis Bordet has written and published several theatre pieces.

=== Pieces ===
- Tarpeia, L'Harmattan, 2013. (ISBN 9782343010342)
- Hippocampe, L'Harmattan, 2013. (ISBN 9782343010335)
- Eudaimonia, L'Harmattan, 2015. (ISBN 9782343063911)
- J'irai souffrir pour toi au Golgotha suivi de Mea culpa, L'Harmattan, 2019. (ISBN 9782343183749)
- Talion aiguille, L'Harmattan, 2019. (ISBN 9782343178547)
- [Preface] Cramoisir d'Amandine Dhée, L'Onde Théâtrale, 2022. (ISBN 9782957799022)

== See also ==
- University of Lille
