= Arts et Métiers =

Arts et Métiers may refer to:

- Arts et Métiers ParisTech or ENSAM, a French elite Engineering institute
- Arts et Métiers station, a Paris Metro station
- Musée des Arts et Métiers, a museum of science and technology in Paris
- Conservatoire National des Arts et Métiers (CNAM), or National Conservatory of Arts and Crafts
- Descriptions des Arts et Métiers, a French book
- École Catholique des Arts et Métiers of Lyon, a French engineering school
