= École polytechnique universitaire de Lille =

French engineering College

University Polytechnical School of Lille
- École polytechnique universitaire de Lille
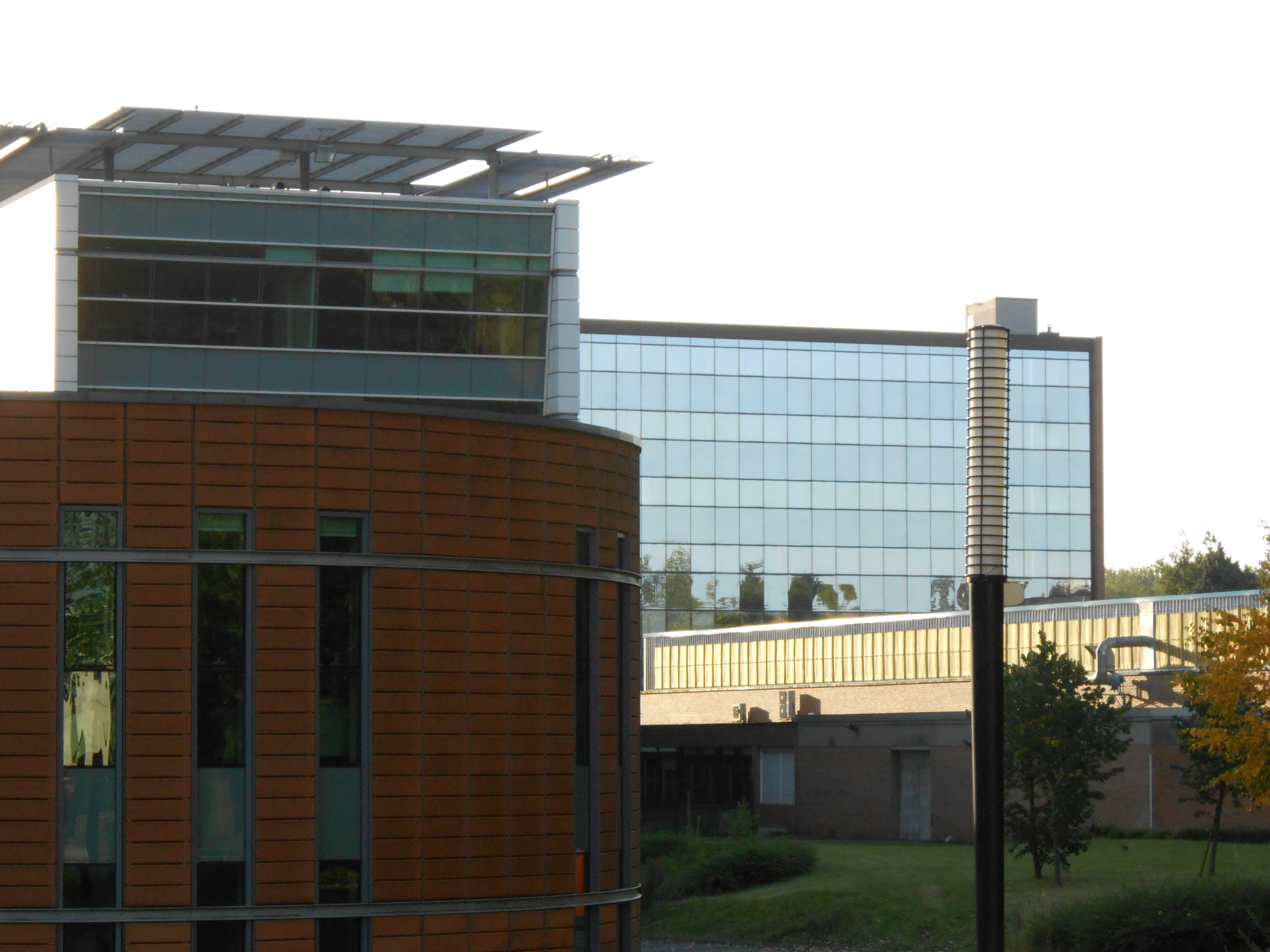
- The main building
- Type: Public Engineering college
- Established: 1974
- Accreditation: Commission des Titres d'ingénieurs
- Affiliations: University of Lille
- President: Nicolas Burlion
- Vice-president: Cyril Ruckebusch
- Students: 1200
- Location: Villeneuve-d'Ascq, Hauts-de-France, France; 50.60766°N 3.13620°E
- Campus: 150ha; Suburbs
- Language: French
- Website: www.polytech-lille.fr

École polytechnique universitaire de Lille (Polytech Lille) is a French engineering College created in 1974. It is one of the 204 Colleges accredited by the Commission des Titres d'Ingénieurs (CTI).

Polytech Lille is located on the Cité Scientifique campus in Villeneuve d'Ascq, France, a suburb of the French city of Lille. It is a public school part of the University of Lille as well as the Polytech group, the largest group of engineering colleges in France. The college's official name is "Ecole polytechnique universitaire de Lille" or " University Polytechnic School of Lille" as stated in the decree n°2002-468 dated 4 avril 2002, however the usual name is "Polytech Lille". It was established in 2002 following the fusion of the EUDIL (former name) with the IAAL and IESP colleges and the creation of the Polytech Group.

== History ==
=== L'Ecole universitaire d'ingénieurs de Lille (EUDIL) ===
The first lessons began in the fall of 1969, on an experimental basis, in Building D adjacent to the École Centrale de Lille, at the newly established University of Lille-1. The three open departments were: Civil Engineering, Computer Science-Measurements-Automation, and Technical-Commercial Careers, Metrology. The Department of Materials Science will open the following year.

In 1971, the first "sciences and technology" master's degrees were formalized. They were merged in 1974 to create the University School of Engineering of Lille (EUDIL).

On April 16, 1974, the universities of Lille and Montpellier became the first two French universities authorized by the Commission des titres d'ingénieurs to award engineering degrees through initial training.

Six years later, on February 14, 1980, EUDIL was authorized to award engineering degrees through continuing education for the GTGC and IMA departments initially, and on October 1, 1990, for all its other departments (up to that point, French students were required to complete a "classe préparatoire" in order to join an engineering college).

In 1985, the IAAL (Agri-food Engineering) was created. On April 22, 1986, a decree from the Ministry of National Education authorized the University of Lille-1 to award engineering degrees for IAAL and five departments of Eudil: Civil Engineering, IMA, ITEC, Materials, and Mechanics.

In 1989, EUDIL, along with the University Center for Sciences and Technology in Clermont-Ferrand, ISIM in Montpellier, and ISTG in Grenoble, decided to come together to gain better visibility at the national and international levels. This marked the birth of the Eiffel Network (Predecessor to the Polytech Group). In 1992, the recruitment for these three schools became joint.

Starting in 1994, the creation of a tertiary computer science department was initiated, which would come to fruition in 1999 under the name GIS (Computer Engineering and Statistics).

=== Ingénieurs d'exploitation des systèmes de production (IESP) ===
In 1992, the School of Production Systems Operations Engineering (IESP) was established at the University of Lille 1 in response to the call from industrial partners (seven original partners and two professional sectors: metallurgy and chemistry) to provide training, through apprenticeship and continuous education, for production engineers with capabilities in both technical and management aspects.

In 1994, the "production" specialization degree was established in partnership with the Institute of Engineering Techniques for the Industry of Nord Pas-de-Calais. In 2002, through a merger with EUDIL-IAAL, the school became the 8th major of Polytech Lille; the only major in partnership. In 2004, an apprenticeship pathway was created to access the specialization degree in production.

=== Polytech Lille ===
EUDIL was then in full expansion, and the school's historic building had become too small and too old to accommodate all the students. The decision to construct a new building was made. This building would be erected on the grounds previously occupied by the parking lot. The first construction works began on October 28, 1997, and two years later, on November 5, 1999, the new EUDIL-IAAL building was inaugurated.

The decree formalizing the merger of EUDIL, IAAL, and IESP and the creation of the University Polytechnic School of Lille was published in the official journal on April 4, 2002. The school adopted the common name of Polytech Lille. In September of the same year, the first official intake of the University Polytechnic School of Lille took place, offering 9 majors.

== Education ==
With its nine majors, Polytech Lille covers the entire spectrum of major engineering fields. Its training offerings range from post-baccalaureate to specialized master's degrees. Its engineering program (3 years) is accessible after completing a pathway through Polytech engineering schools or CPGE, L2, L3, BUT, M1.

The nine masters offered by the school in the engineering program are:

- Geomatics and Urban Engineering **
- Computer Science and Statistics * ;
- Civil Engineering * ;
- Materials;
- Biological and Food Engineering;
- Production **;
- Embedded Systems * ;
- Instrumentation and Business Engineering ;
- Mechanical Engineering.

* Available in apprenticeship.

** Only available in apprenticeship.

The school also offers an integrated two-year post-baccalaureate program common to the whole polytech group calles "PEIP" (Parcours des Ecoles d'Ingénieurs Polytech):

PEIP A: Generalist pathway

PEIP B: Biology pathway

== Student life ==
There are two "associations": The Bureau des Elèves or BDE (students' council) and the SONO (DJs). The BDE is the entity responsible of orchestrating the entirety of student life ranging from sports to nightlife.

Within the BDE there are 22 clubs covering a large range of activities:

1. Bureau des Sports (Sports club);
2. Bureau des Arts (Arts club);
3. Le 10^5 (The school's bar);
4. Les Pompoms (Cheerleading club);
5. Le Rock at Lille (Rock dance club);
6. Le Gymnase (Sports club mainly focused on bodybuilding);
7. Le Studio (Videos and Pictures club);
8. Polydance (Dance club);
9. L'instru (Music club);
10. L'éléphant phare (Fanfare club);
11. Circotech (Circus club);
12. L'Huma (Humanitarian club);
13. La Comedia del Polytech (Theatre club);
14. Club Régates (sailing club);
15. Le RACE (Motorized vehicles club);
16. L'EESTEC (Electrical Engineering STudents' European assoCiation);
17. L'Agrimentaire (food club)
18. Le club informatique (computer science club);
19. Poly'games (Video and board games club);
20. Le PAF! (The School's newspapers);
21. Robotech (Robots club);
22. La Radio (Radio club).

Furthermore, there is a Junior Entreprise: PULCE.

=== PULCE ===
PULCE (acronym for "École polytechnique universitaire de Lille Conseil et Études") is the Junior Entreprise of Polytech Lille. Founded in 2016, it is a part of the largest student movement in France, the National Confederation of Junior Enterprises.

PULCE is a non-profit organization governed by student engineers. It operates as a consulting firm and aims to apply the knowledge acquired by future engineers in school to real projects for businesses (small and medium-sized enterprises as well as large corporations). It offers studies in the fields of engineering, prototyping, and programming.

== Directors ==
mandat		Directeur
1969	1973	Jean-Pierre Beaufils
1974	1980	Francis Louage
1981	1992	Gérard Journel (1933-2010)
1993	2002	Pierre Legrand (1940-2008)
2003	2007	Jean-Louis Bon
2008	2013	Jean-Christophe Camart
2013	2023	Guy Reumont
2023		Nicolas Burlion
