= École catholique des arts et métiers =

French engineering college

ECAM Lyon
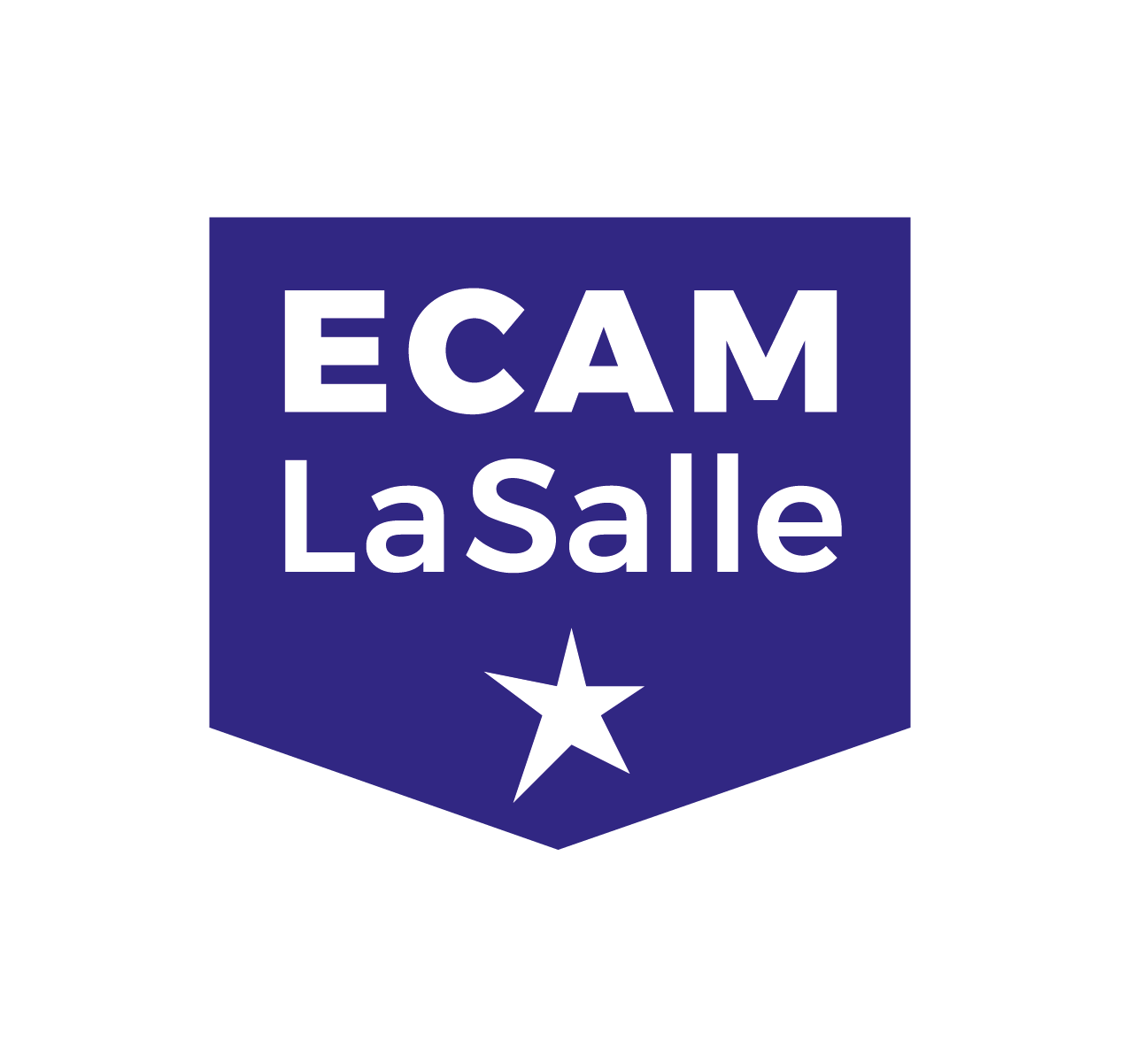
- Established: 1900
- President: Yves Colliou
- Director: Didier Desplanche
- Academic staff: 200
- Students: 1300
- Location: Lyon, 69005, France; 45.7645°N 4.8253°E
- Website: https://www.ecam.fr

The École catholique d'arts et métiers (ECAM) of Lyon is an engineering school, it is one of the French "Grandes écoles". It was founded in Reims in 1900 and moved to Lyon in 1946, on the hills of Fourvière.

== History ==
ECAM Lyon was founded in 1900 in response to the demand from industrialists. This non-profit school was founded to train young engineers.

ECAM Lyon is fully recognized by the French Government as a French "Grande Ecole".

== Curriculum ==
The ECAM curriculum comprises scientific and technical courses together with practical training in the 5 following departments: Mechanical Engineering, Materials Science, Electrical and Electronical Engineering, Automation, IT and Production Engineering or carrying out projects. Besides, 3 Trainings are made compulsory in France and abroad (12 months in all). The general knowledge includes: communication techniques, social and economic studies together with foreign languages. The preparatory classes are located on the ECAM Engineering School campus. The curriculum is composed of 3 modules: the scientific courses, the engineer's general knowledge and literary courses among which: foreign languages (English, Japanese, Chinese or German). The engineering curriculum provides the students with 6 semesters identical for every student. The basic sciences for the engineer encompass the major topics of Mechanical Engineering, as follows: Solid and Fluid Mechanics, Vibrations, Structures Calculation, Energetics, Automation, Materials Sciences, Manufacturing together with those of Electrical Engineering, namely: Electrotechnics, Power Electronics, Microelectronics, Servomechanisms. Besides, IT and Engineer's Math are to be added. The general and professional knowledge comprises: foreign languages, the discovery of foreign cultures through their successive stages, the corporate life: management, strategy, labor law, etc.

== Facilities ==
The laboratory courses and projects offer the students the opportunity to work with the latest hardware and software, thus allowing them to be immediately operational in a wide range of scientific and technical fields. With more than 350 on-line computers, ECAM has access to advanced communication technologies. Four self-access computer-rooms are available 24 hours, 7 days a week. High-speed internet together with video-conference facilities, among others, allow efficient remote design cooperation. Every ECAM student has their own mail address.

== Figures ==
- 1300 students, 14% of whom are female
- 3 internships (average) during the whole curriculum
- 116 students in the Institut des Techniques d'Ingénieur de l'Industrie curriculum
- 50 Industrial contracts in research and development
- 59 double degree programs
- 12:1 student-faculty ratio
- 5 faculty departments : Energy, IT and Automation, Material and Structures, Industrial Management and Languages & Interpersonal and professional development
- 60 partner universities worldwide
- 8 000 engineer graduates since its creation in 1900

== Notable alumni ==
- Pierre Dupasquier, former head of Michelin's Competition Department
