= Jean Jacques Thomas =

American academic (born 1954)

Jean-Jacques Thomas
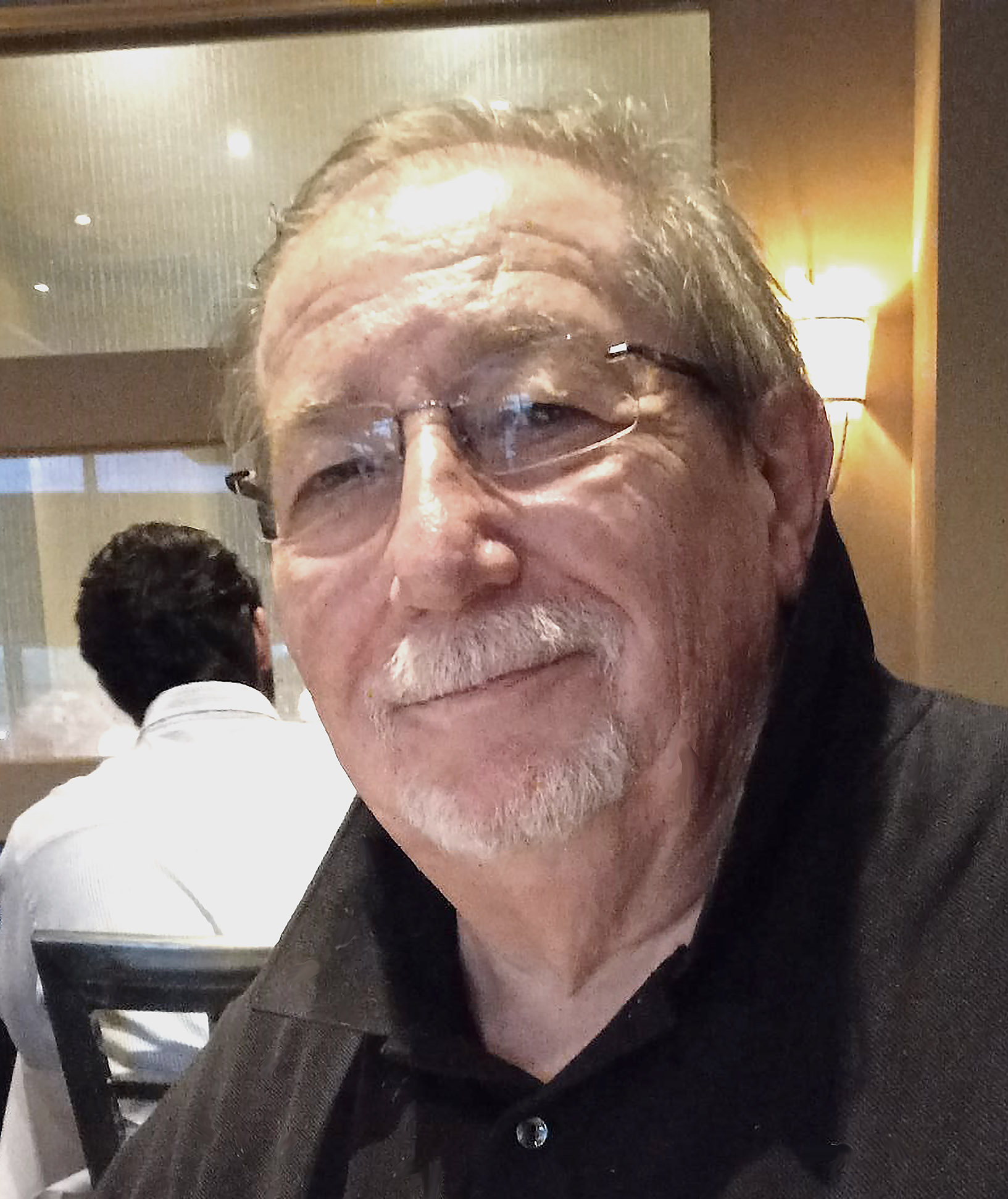
- Born: 17 January 1954 (age 72); Mirecourt, France
- Occupations: Littérateur, academic, and author
- Awards: Chevalier des Palmes Académiques

Academic background
- Education: BA, MA, and Ph.D.
- Alma mater: University of Lille; National Institute for Oriental Languages and Civilizations; University of Paris

Jean-Jacques Thomas (born 17 January 1954) is a littérateur, academic, and an author. He is a Distinguished Professor at the State University of New York (SUNY), and the Founder of Big Buffalo Quebec Cinema Week, Québec Cinema Week at Duke, and Paris based, EDUCO Association. He held the Melodia E. Jones Endowed Chair in the Department of Romance Languages and Literatures until 2020. His research interests range from poetics, French linguistics, semiotics to poetry and visual culture, and new world francophone studies and Atlantic literatures and culture of the United States. He has published several books on poetics and contemporary French poetry as well as Francophone literature and theory including, Poética generativa, Perec en Amérique, Poeticized Language: The Foundations of Contemporary French Poetry, and Joël Des Rosiers: L’échappée Lyrique Des Damnes De La Mer.

Thomas is the co-founder and Member of the editorial board, Literary Semiotics, and Formes Poétiques Contemporaine. Since 2008, he has been the executive director of Formulas: revue des créations formelles.

== Education ==
Thomas graduated with a Bachelor of Classics in 1968, and M.A. of grammar, literature and stylistics from the University of Lille. He did his Ph.D. in Poetics, Linguistics, and Stylistics at Paris 8 University Vincennes-Saint-Denis. Subsequently, he joined the University of Michigan and completed his post-doctoral degree in Linguistics there.

== Career ==
Thomas started his academic career as a research assistant from 1970 to 1972 at the University of Paris (Sorbonne, Paris-8). Subsequently, he took an appointment as Visiting Lecturer in the department of romance languages and literatures at the University of Michigan. From 1975 to 1981, he was an assistant professor at Columbia University. Later on, he held a brief appointment as associate professor, and in 1990 was promoted to a professor in the department of romance studies and department of Linguistics at the Duke University. From 2008 to 2020, he held the concurrent appointments of Melodia E. Jones Endowed Chair, Professor of Romance Languages and Literatures, and an Affiliate Faculty for Comparative Literature department, and Poetics Program in English Department. Currently, he serves as a Distinguished Professor in the department of romance languages and literatures at the State University of New York (SUNY).

In 1990, Thomas held an appointment of chair for the Department of Romance Studies for five years, followed up by an appointment as a Director for the Institute of North American and Canadian Studies at the Duke University. He has served as Director of French Summer Institute of French and Francophone Studies at the University of California from 1989 to 2005, and Director of Big Buffalo Quebec Cinema Week (Spring) from 2014 to 2019, and Quebec Cinema Week (Fall) and from 2005 to 2008 based in University at Buffalo.

Thomas is the Founder of Big Buffalo Quebec Cinema Week. He has served as the President of EDUCO for many years.

== Research ==
Thomas’ research interests span French literature and culture of 19th, 20th and 21st Centuries, poetry and poetics, French and general linguistics, European modernism, and francophone in North America, and he has authored numerous books, essays, ciné-poems, and critiques on the subjects.

=== French poetry and literature ===
Thomas has put emphasis on the linguistic aspects of poems written in French, and contemporary French poetry. In his work, "L' illisibilité en questions", he expanded on the modernity of French poetry. The study calls on the works on Michel Deguy, Jean-Marie Gleize, Christian Prigent, and Nathalie Quintane and look into the poetic illegibility. It suggests to reevaluate, at the theoretical level, the issue of illegibility (poetic or not), less as a tactic than as a constrained readability, in response to the search for alter readability. The method of choice combines elements of philosophy, semiotics, poetics, and pragmatics. He also explored the works of Pierre Alferi, particularly the impact of French contemporary focused journal, Revue de Littérature Générale.

Developing upon the case of embracing modernity and realism, he presented the literary journey of Butor, who was a French poet, novelist, and, essayist. He expanded on the aspects of experimental writing and realism in Butor's work. He also characterized that the work of French poet, politician, and one of the founders of négritude movement in Francophone literature, Aimé Césaire and indicated that Césaire's political discourse received recognition primarily due to his work in literary field. His research on the Poet's work elaborated on his poetic style, which often united poetry and prose. It was also disclosed that socio-political & literary alienation both are refused in the works of Césaire.

=== Formal Plasticity ===
Thomas’ essay, "Délivrez-nous! Plasticité digitale et écriture poétique" focuses on digital plasticity. He highlights how creative writers of the current age reliant on specialized computer programs to generate poetry can incorporate their work into the global literary studies. Having discussed that, he also proposed models of 3D video-poems.

Thomas's book Perec en Amérique received a review in the webzine for information on French and Francophone literature and art, Acta Fabula in 2019. Jean Daive who is a poet specialized in international translations also reviewed Perec en Amérique and argued that it investigates foreign influences and trends in the work of Perec and "sheds light differently and with more accuracy on biography." He suggested that since French critical establishment only wanted to see Perec as a French writer of novels, "The book appears in 2019 in a great silence. No reaction. No article..." and is mostly ignored by them. Cecile De Bary in the book review indicated how author highlighted the paradox regarding the reception of Georges Perec in America, "who today has everything of a classic, remained confidential for a long time" and analyzed the impact of American culture on his writing. Defining the comprehensive synthesis in Thomas's work, the reviewer states that writer investigated tangible elements of Perec's journey granted the access to unpublished sources in the American archives, consequently leading him to dedicate the book chapters "to the American episodes of Perec's life..." and present it in an "organized chronologically" manner. De Bary states that Thomas's work, "restores with great clarity a number of fact... by the figures of the future French Theory". In another review of the book, biographer Bellos pointed out that Thomas's book aims to describe why Perec could not find footing in the literary scene in US and calls attention to an important point different than that of Thomas, "Perec had no academic qualifications, did not write literary criticism, and did not express himself in theoretical terms, so he could hardly be considered a ‘French intellectual’ in American eyes". Bellos also suggests readers to fact-check as, "Perec made three, not two films for cinema and television (p. 21); his mother’s death certificate was issued in 1958, not 1968...".

Ann Judge wrote a book review of Thomas' book, La Langue volée. Judge characterized the content of some chapter rather familiar however, "treated in an interested manner with the author finding links between past and contemporary linguistic theories." Thomas stated that the development of language is based on its daily use however, for French language, the constant referral to grammar and literature was regarded as a model of development. He also indicated that unless French embraces modernity it will not survive in today's society.

Thomas’ last book, Joël Des Rosiers. The lyrical escape of the damned of the sea was reviewed in the Montreal newspaper, Le Devoir. Corriveau claimed that Thomas wants to address various aspects of the subject's poetic works, and thus, "illuminates in a meticulous way the paths to be taken to decode the desire." The critic characterizes this book as radical and states that the work of Joël Des Rosiers is, "freed from the weight of ancestral fetishism" and "the poetry of Des Rosiers will be embodied in the new territories it discovers, will put itself in the present of emotion." The critic also expressed his desire for book author "to linger over more in-depth literary analyzes to show us more concretely the new contribution of this writing", and regarded this piece of writing as "transnational, enlightening, as well as work of great richness".

== Awards and honors ==
- 1984 – Chevalier des Palmes Académiques, French and Languages, Bernard Cerquiglini

== Bibliography ==
=== Books ===
- Continental Theory Buffalo: Transatlantic Crossroads of a Critical Insurrection (2021) ISBN 9781438486451
- Poeticized Language: The Foundations of Contemporary French Poetry (2000) ISBN 9780271018126
- Oulipo: Chroniques Des Années Héroïques (1978-2018) (2019) ISBN 9789403645513
- Joël Des Rosiers. L’échappée Lyrique Des Damnes De La Mer (2022) 9782895187936
- Perec en Amérique (2019) ISBN 9782874496639
- Poeticized Language: The Foundations of Contemporary French Poetry (2019) ISBN 9780271018133
- Concordance-Poemes By/Par Yves Bonnefoy (1999) ISBN 9780889465749
- La langue volée: Histoire intellectuelle de la formation de la langue française (1989) ISBN 9783261041333
- Poética generativa (1981) ISBN 9789505061853

=== Selected articles ===
- Thomas, J. J. (1987). Metaphor: The Image and the Formula. Poetics Today, 8(3/4), 479–501. https://doi.org/10.2307/1772564
- Thomas, J. J., & Hilliker, L. (1988). README.DOC: On Oulipo. SubStance, 17(2), 18–28. https://doi.org/10.2307/3685136
- Thomas, J. J. (2004). Roland Barthes: A Beginner's Guide. SubStance, 33(1), 152–155. https://doi.org/10.1353/sub.2004.0015
- Thomas, J. J. (2008). Jean-Marie Gleize's Poetic Pics. L’Esprit Créateur, 48(2), 32–45. http://www.jstor.org/stable/26289429
- Thomas, J. J. (2008). Photographic Memories of French Poetry: Denis Roche, Jean-Marie Gleize. Yale French Studies, 114, 18–36. http://www.jstor.org/stable/20479415
- Thomas, J. J. (2009). Formulations: accessibilité et ostentation de la poésie extrême contemporaine. Formules, 13, 97–137. https://www.ieeff.org/formulations.pdf
- Thomas, J. J. (2016). Aimé Césaire : Poetry, First and Foremost. https://www.ieeff.org/fpc11thomascesaire.pdf
