= Joel Ferri =

French doctor, academic and author (born 1959)

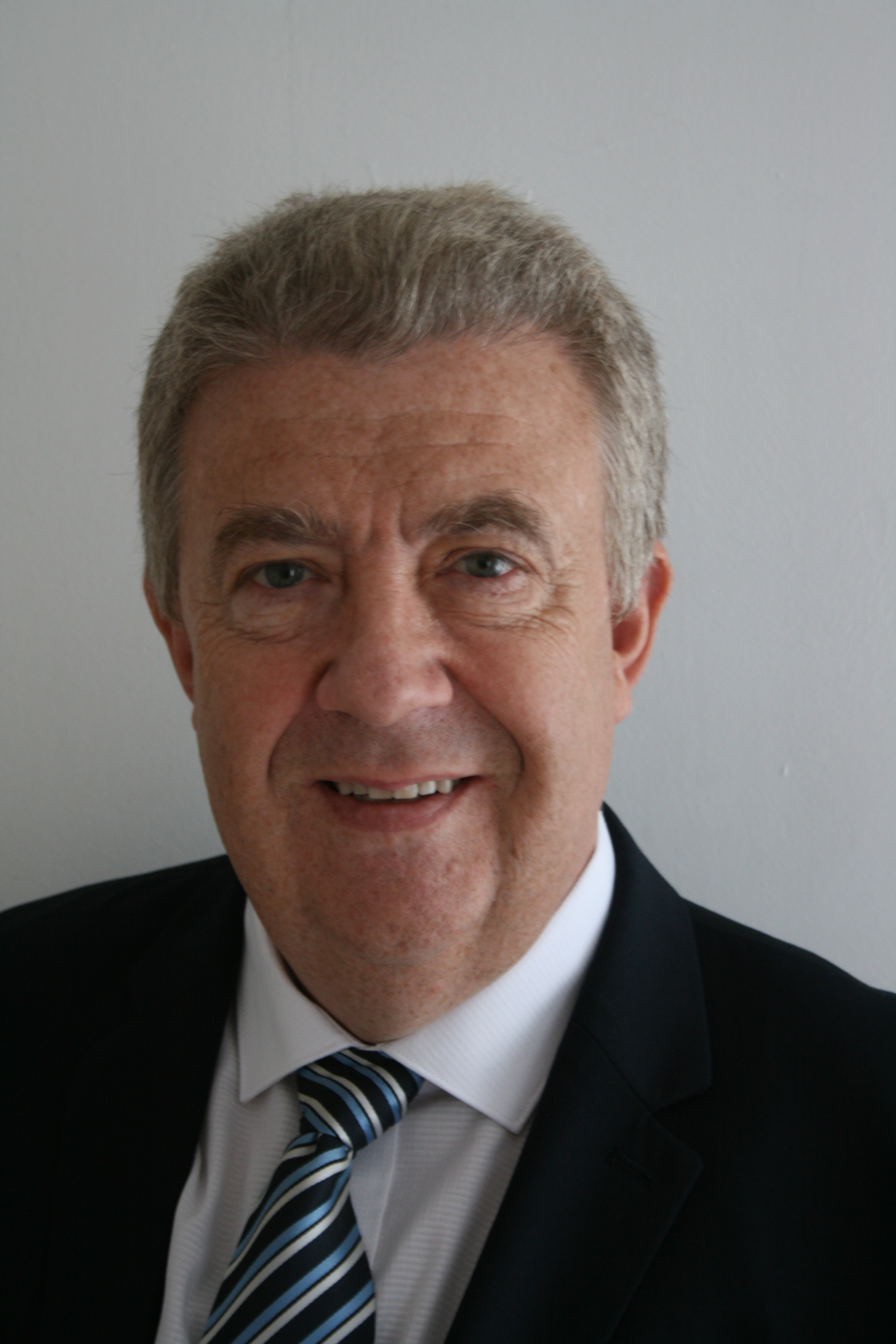
- Born: 10 August 1959 (age 67); Nantes, France
- Occupations: Stomatologist; maxillofacial surgeon; academic; author

Academic background
- Education: Medical Degree; PhD
- Alma mater: Nantes University

Joel Ferri (born 10 August 1959) is a French stomatologist, oral and maxillofacial surgeon, academic and author. He is the chair and head of the Department of Oral and Maxillofacial Surgery at the Lille Medical School.

Ferri is most known for his contributions to stomatology and maxillofacial surgery outcomes, with a special involvement in bone surgery (orthognathic surgery, bone reconstruction, TMJ prosthesis). Among his notable works are his publications in academic journals, including the American Journal of Orthodontics and Dentofacial Orthopedics and Journal of Oral and Maxillofacial Surgery as well as an edited book titled Preprosthetic and Maxillofacial Surgery: Biomaterials, Bone Grafting and Tissue Engineering.

== Education ==
Ferri earned his medical degree from Nantes University in 1990. Additionally, he acquired a specialized Diploma in Stomatology and Maxillofacial Surgery, along with a diploma in Facial and Neck Surgery. Subsequently, in 1996, he successfully completed his PhD.

== Career ==
Ferri is Professor Delaire’s pupil. From him he learned the rules of dentofacial orthopedics and orthodontics. Therefore, understanding the mechanisms of craniomaxillofacial growth and balance, associated with his strong surgical background, he developed an original approach to orthognathic surgery and maxillofacial bone surgery. Ferri was appointed as a professor in the Department of Oral and Maxillofacial Surgery at the University of Lille in 1997. From 2004 to 2008 he served as the president of the International Bone Research Association and as the president of the French Society of Stomatology and Maxillofacial Surgery in 2011. In 2022 as a result of his involvement of the head and neck malformations he was admitted as a member of the Undiagnosed Disease Network International (UDNI). He was admitted as a member of the European Society of TMJ Surgeons (ESTMJS) and was appointed president of this society in 2017. Moreover, he has been serving as the chairman and head of the Department of Oral and Maxillofacial Surgery at the Lille medical school since 1997. Ferri is the founding member of IAOMM (international Association of Oral and Maxillofacial Medicine)

== Research ==
Ferri's early research was focused on the bone of the maxillo-facial area. He conducted a retrospective study comparing the advantages and disadvantages of mandibular reconstruction using a fibula free flap versus other techniques. The study found that while the fibula flap offers benefits like bone length and low donor site morbidity, it may not be suitable for large soft tissue defects, with the conclusion that it is satisfactory for defects over 20 cm in size. While investigating the relationship between the fiber-type composition of the masseter muscle and different bite patterns in individuals undergoing surgical correction of malocclusion, his 2005 research revealed significant associations between muscle composition and vertical bite characteristics, particularly in Class III subjects. In the same year, through his research, he presented a surgical protocol using bimaxillary advancement and adjunctive procedures for the treatment of obstructive sleep apnea syndrome (OSAS) in patients affected by facial or mandible retrusion, demonstrating a high success rate in reducing the apnea/hypopnea index and improving patient outcomes.

Ferri's 2010 work examined the impact of orthognathic surgery on temporomandibular joint (TMJ) disorders, finding that while the surgery significantly reduces TMJ symptoms in patients with pre-operative symptoms, there is a risk of new onset of TMJ symptoms post-surgery, albeit with a low occurrence rate. In 2011, he co-edited the book titled Reprosthetic and Maxillofacial Surgery: Biomaterials, Bone Grafting and Tissue Engineering, wherein he provided a comprehensive overview of preprosthetic and maxillofacial surgery, focusing on bone grafting, reconstructive surgery, and tissue engineering to enhance dental implant success and patient rehabilitation. His 2014 work with Andreas Neff and others evaluated treatment strategies for mandibular condylar fractures, finding a growing consensus among experts favouring open reduction with internal fixation (ORIF) as the gold standard, especially for displaced fractures, with considerations for endoscopic approaches and pediatric cases. In 2016, he reported a case of osteochimionecrosis on a fibula flap transferred for mandibular reconstruction, demonstrating that the transferred bone behaved similarly to the original one, thereby proving that environmental factors dictate bone behavior and pathophysiology regardless of its original nature. His 2017 work was a retrospective study comparing recurrence rates of ameloblastoma following conservative and radical treatments, revealing a significantly higher recurrence rate in the conservative treatment group, suggesting treatment should be tailored based on tumor characteristics and patient factors. More recently, in 2022 he explored the regeneration potential of bone substitutes using a rabbit model with two different types of critical-sized defects, validating the model for calvaria defects but not for mandibular defects, and suggesting further research to improve mandibular defect design.

== Bibliography ==
=== Books ===
- Ferri, Joël; Hunziker, Ernst B., eds. (2011). Preprosthetic and Maxillofacial Surgery: Biomaterials, Bone Grafting and Tissue Engineering. Elsevier. ISBN 978-0-85709-242-7.

=== Selected articles ===
- Ferri, Joel; Piot, Benoit; Ruhin, Blandine; Mercier, Jacques (May 1997). "Advantages and limitations of the fibula free flap in mandibular reconstruction". Journal of Oral and Maxillofacial Surgery. 55 (5): 440–448. doi:10.1016/s0278-2391(97)90685-6. PMID 9146512.
- Rowlerson, Anthea; Raoul, Gwénaël; Daniel, Yousif; Close, John; Maurage, Claude-Alain; Ferri, Joel; Sciote, James J. (January 2005). "Fiber-type differences in masseter muscle associated with different facial morphologies". American Journal of Orthodontics and Dentofacial Orthopedics. 127 (1): 37–46. doi:10.1016/j.ajodo.2004.03.025. PMC 3848722. PMID 15643413.
- Smatt, Y; Ferri, J (September 2005). "Retrospective Study of 18 Patients Treated by Maxillomandibular Advancement with Adjunctive Procedures for Obstructive Sleep Apnea Syndrome". Journal of Craniofacial Surgery. 16 (5): 770–777. doi:10.1097/01.scs.0000179746.98789.0f. PMID 16192855.
- Dujoncquoy, J. P.; Ferri, J.; Raoul, G.; Kleinheinz, J. (2010). "Temporomandibular joint dysfunction and orthognathic surgery: a retrospective study - PMC". Head & Face Medicine. 6: 27. doi:10.1186/1746-160X-6-27. PMC 2998459. PMID 21083902.
- Depeyre, Arnaud; Touzet-Roumazeille, Sandrine; Lauwers, Ludovic; Raoul, Gwenael; Ferri, Joel (September 2016). "Retrospective evaluation of 211 patients with maxillofacial reconstruction using parietal bone graft for implants insertion". Journal of Cranio-Maxillofacial Surgery. 44 (9): 1162–1169. doi:10.1016/j.jcms.2016.06.034. PMID 27502149.
- Gryseleyn, Rémi; Maes, Jean-Michel; Ferri, Joël (17 March 2016). "Osteochemonecrosis after Mandible Reconstruction". New England Journal of Medicine. 374 (11): 1097–1098. doi:10.1056/NEJMc1509760. PMID 26981949.
- Laborde, A.; Nicot, R.; Wojcik, T.; Ferri, J.; Raoul, G. (February 2017). "Ameloblastoma of the jaws: Management and recurrence rate". European Annals of Otorhinolaryngology, Head and Neck Diseases. 134 (1): 7–11. doi:10.1016/j.anorl.2016.09.004. PMID 27793625.
- Ferri, Joël; Schlund, Matthias; Roland-Billecart, Thomas; Nicot, Romain (May 2019). "Modified Mandibular Sagittal Split Osteotomy". Journal of Craniofacial Surgery. 30 (3): 897–899. doi:10.1097/SCS.0000000000005092. PMID 30608375.
