= University of Lille =

French public research university based in Lille

Coordinates: 50.6316596°N 3.0730095°E

- Université de Lille
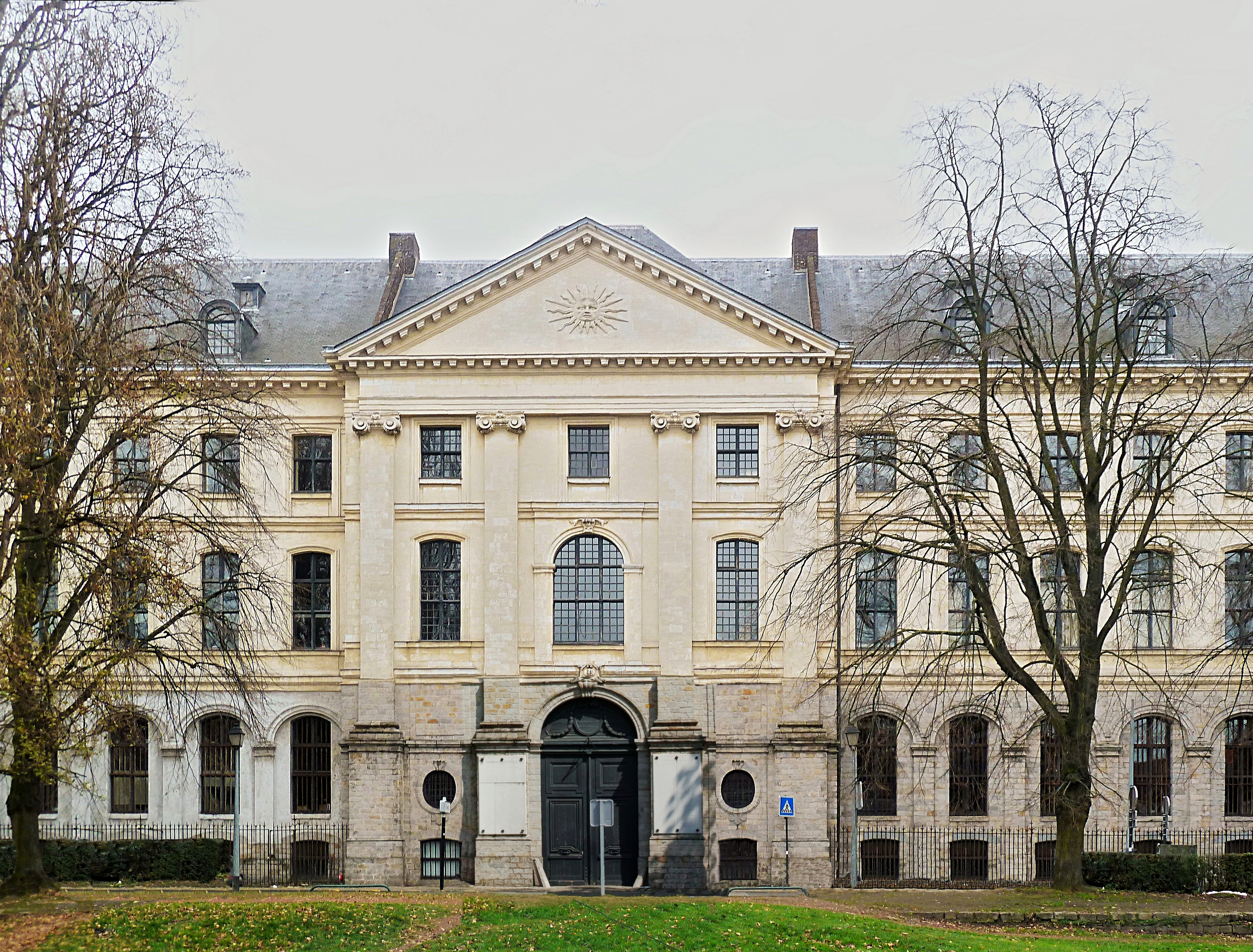
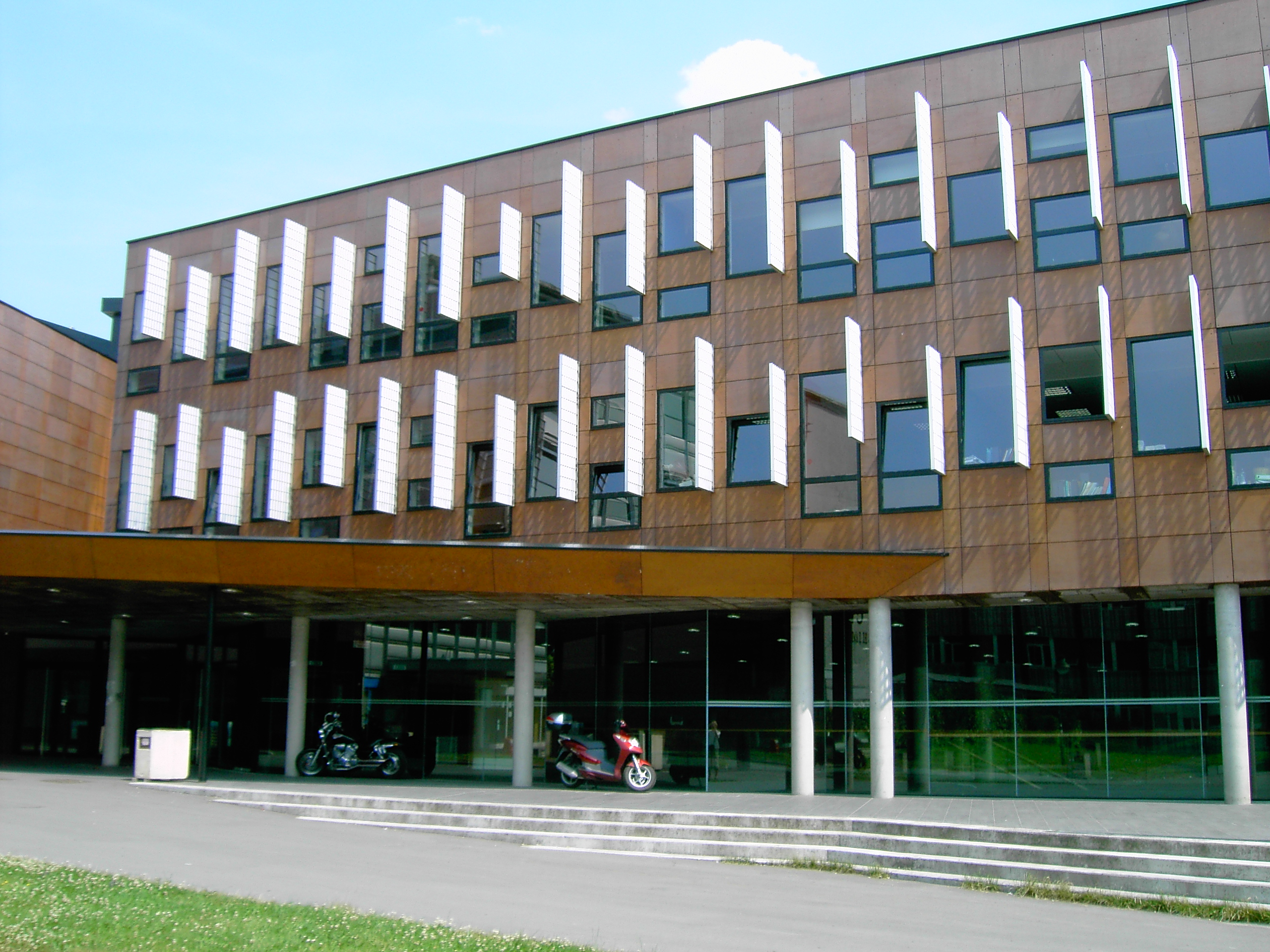
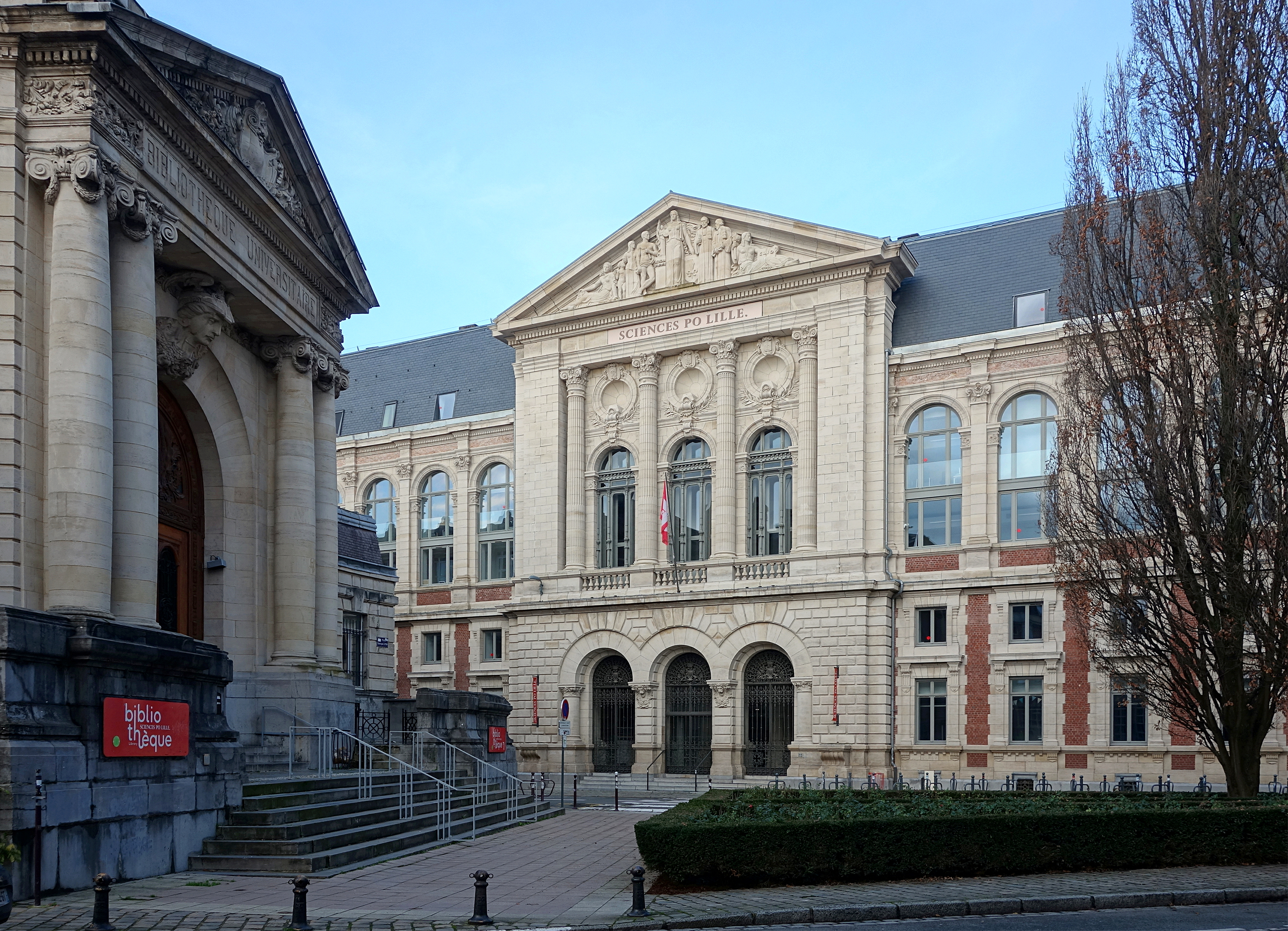
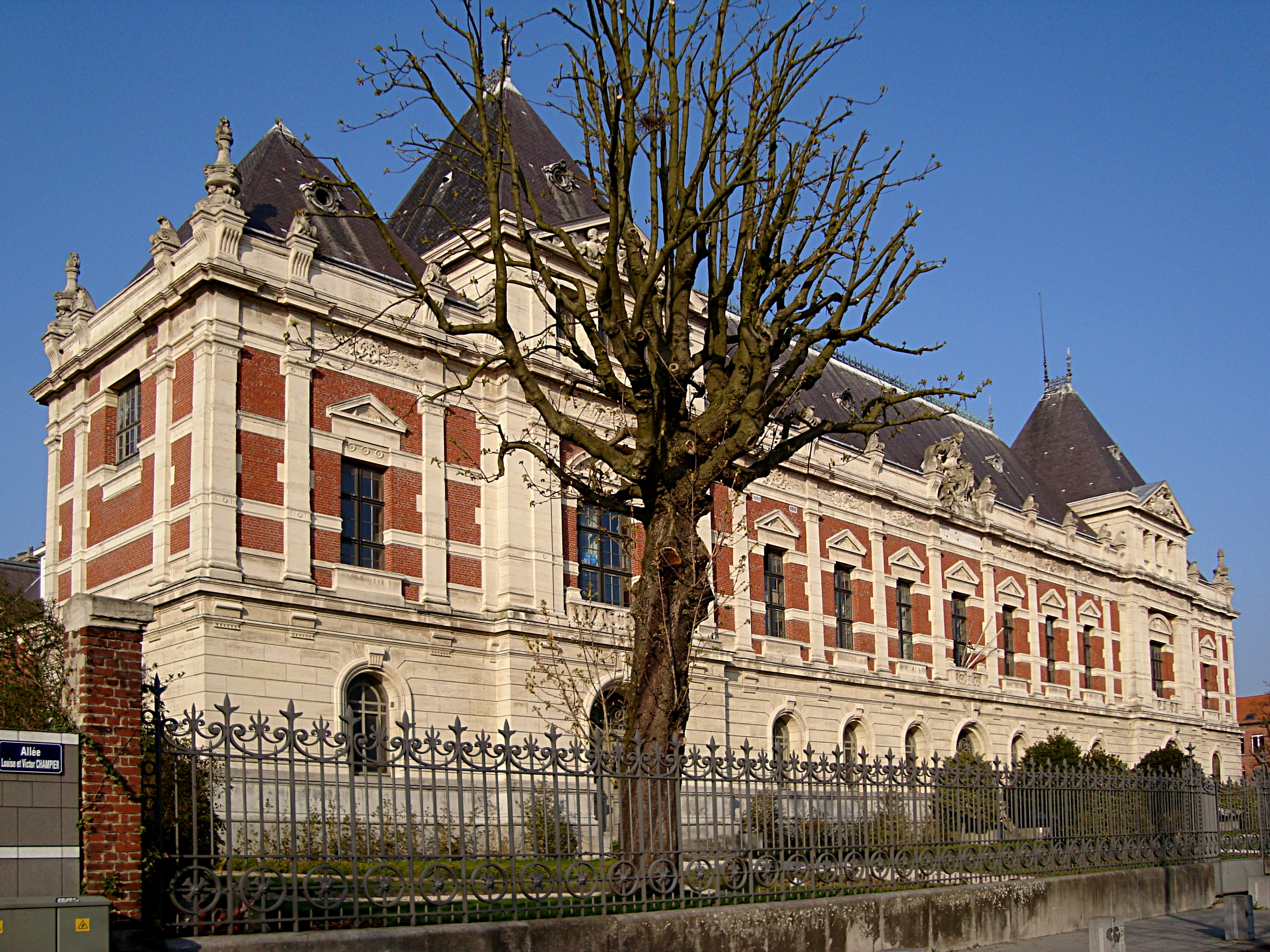
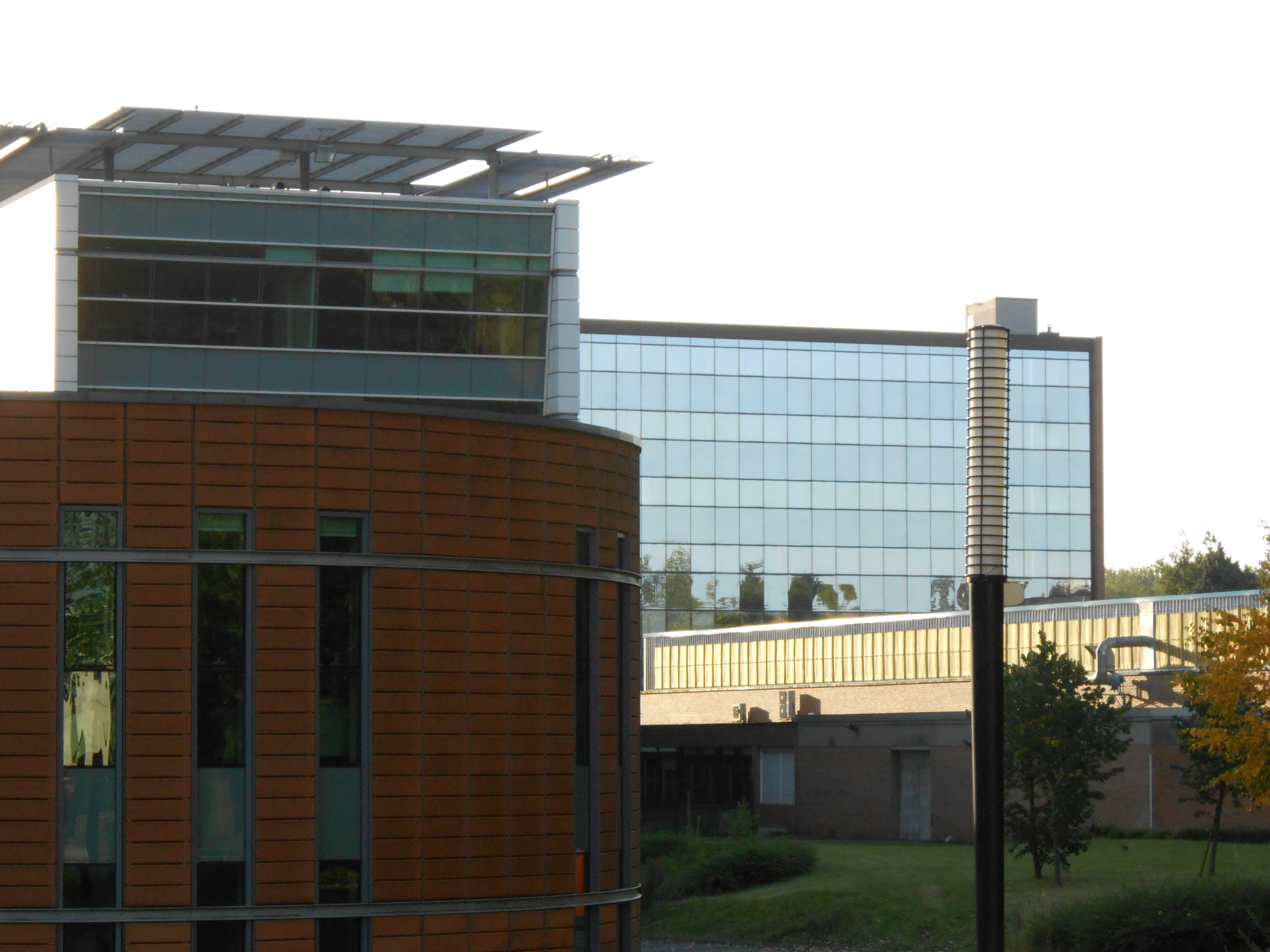
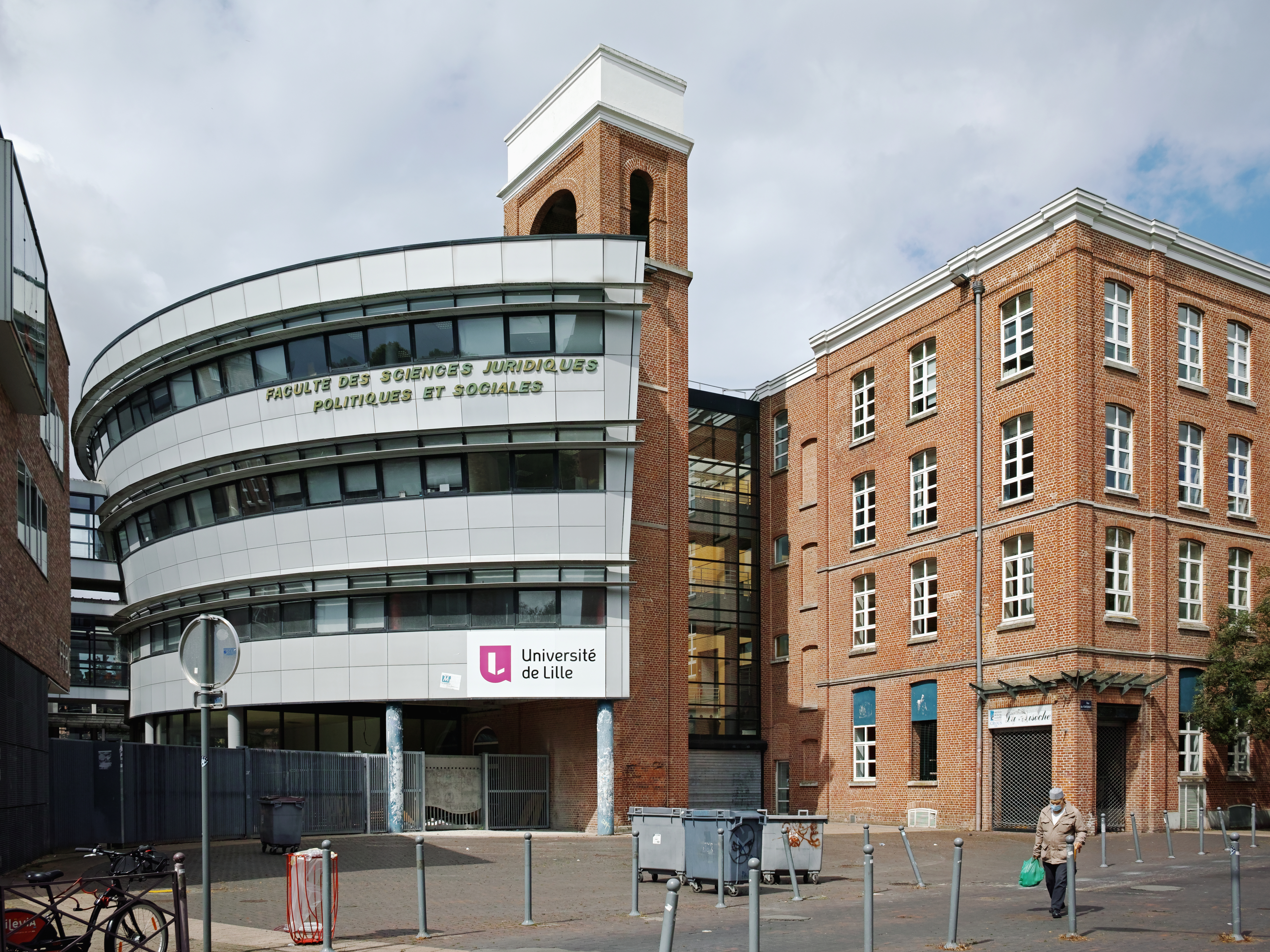
- Latin: Universitas Insulensis
- Motto: Universitas Insulensis Olim Duacensis (Latin)
- Type: Public university
- Established: 1559, 1896, 2018
- Affiliations: Utrecht Network; IMCC; EUA
- Budget: €800 million per year
- President: Régis Bordet
- Academic staff: 3,300
- Administrative staff: 6,700
- Students: 80,000
- Doctoral students: 1,800
- Location: Six university campuses in the Métropole européenne de Lille (Lille - Villeneuve d'Ascq - Roubaix - Tourcoing), Hauts-de-France, France
- Research labs: 64
- Website: www.univ-lille.fr

The University of Lille (French: Université de Lille, abbreviated as ULille, UDL or univ-lille) is a French public research university based in Lille, in the Nord department of Hauts-de-France region. With more than 80,000 students, it is one of the largest universities in France. It is currently the only public research university in the Métropole européenne de Lille, with 15 Schools and Divisions spread across six campuses, and it is part of the Académie de Lille.

The university was founded in 1559 as the University of Douai. Several faculties are being created in Lille, and all remaining Douai faculties were subsequently officially transferred to Lille in 1896 as University of Lille, later becoming three independent universities in 1970. In 2018, the three independent universities (Lille 1 University of Science and Technology, Lille 2 University of Health and Law, and Charles de Gaulle University – Lille III) merged to once again form the single University of Lille. Until 2019, the university was the main component of the « University of Lille Nord de France », a specific organization which federates universities and other higher learning institutes in the Hauts-de-France region. The University of Lille has absorbed its competencies at the time of its dissolution.

Since 2017, the university has been funded as one of the French universities of excellence. It benefits from an exceptional endowment of 500 million euros to accelerate its strategy in education, research, international development and outreach. The University of Lille features in global university rankings (ARWU, THE, QS), and is a member of several alliances (Erasmus+, Utrecht Network, France Universités, EUA, CURIF Group, NeurotechEU, IMCC, HR Excellence in Research). It has 115 partner universities abroad and awards more than 24,000 degrees annually (primarily licence, master, doctorat).

The university includes a doctoral college with 3,000 PhD students across 150 regional laboratories and seven doctoral schools. With 64 dedicated research labs, 400 PhD theses defended annually, and over 3,000 scientific publications each year, the University of Lille is well-represented in the research community. It collaborates with many organizations (Pasteur Institute of Lille, CHU Lille University Hospital, CNRS, INSERM, INRAE, INRIA, IFREMER, ONERA, IFSTTAR, IRD, CEA, CNES), and schools (École Centrale de Lille, IMT Nord Europe, Arts et Métiers Lille).

The University of Lille should not be confused with the independent and private catholic university of Lille.

== Schools and divisions ==
The University of Lille has 15 Schools and Divisions, which are spread into four major domains:

- Arts, Literature, and Languages;
- Law, Economics, and Management;
- Humanities and Social sciences;
- Science, Technology, and Health.

The University of Lille officially has six main university campuses, located in different cities of the Métropole européenne de Lille.

There are also a few other sites like Wimereux (marine station).

Some former satellite campuses and laboratories of the University of Lille became independent institutions (University of Valenciennes, University of Artois, and University of the Littoral).

=== Cité Scientifique campus (science campus) ===
It is the university campus dedicated to Science and Technology and located in the Villeneuve-d'Ascq technopole, Cité Scientifique district. The campus has 150 hectares and a hundred buildings, and the vast majority of places is occupied by the Departments of the Faculty of Science and Technology (Biology, Chemistry, Mathematics, Physics, Computer Science, Electronics/Electrical Engineering/Automation (EEA), Mechanics, Earth Science). There are also several schools (Ecole Centrale de Lille, IMT Nord Europe, Lille University School of Engineering, University Technical Institute of Lille) and many research laboratories (CNRS, INSERM, INRIA). The buildings are spread around the "LILLIAD Learning Center Innovation", the ultra modern scientific library of the University of Lille with exhibition spaces and conference rooms; and the campus is attached to the European Science Park of "Haute-Borne" (200 hectares).

- Faculty of Science and Technology (FST)
- Faculty of Economics, Social Sciences and Geographical Studies (FASEST)
- Lille University School of Engineering (Polytech' Lille)
- University Technical Institute of Lille (IUT de Lille)

=== Santé campus (health campus) ===
It is the campus dedicated to Health and located between the cities of Lille (South), Loos, and Ronchin; it is the largest university hospital complex in Europe spread over nearly 350 hectares. The Faculty and Departments of the university share the premises with the CHU Lille University Hospital and also with the companies and laboratories of "Eurasanté".

- Faculty of Health and Sports Sciences (UFR3S)

=== Pont-de-Bois campus ===
It is the campus dedicated to Humanities, Social Sciences, Arts, Literature and Languages. It is located in Villeneuve-d'Ascq, district of Pont-de-Bois.

- Faculty of Humanities (FHUMA)
- Faculty of Languages, Cultures and Societies (FLCS)
- Faculty of Psychology and Education Sciences (PSYSEF)
- Lille National School of Architecture and Landscape (ENSAPL)

=== Lille - Moulins campus ===
This campus is spread between Lille city centre, Lille old town, and the district of Moulins in Lille. It is dedicated to Law and Management. It includes the University's headquarters, located in the Lille-Center district, 42 rue Paul Duez. It is the university's historic campus.

- Faculty of Law, Political and Social Sciences (FSJPS)
- Lille Institute of Political Studies (Sciences Po Lille)
- Superior School of Journalism of Lille (ESJ Lille)
- Lille University School of Management (IAE Lille)

=== Roubaix - Tourcoing campus ===
This campus includes several educational sites spread over the close communes of Roubaix and Tourcoing. In addition to schools and faculties, there are also departments and annexes here (information and communication, visual arts, applied foreign languages, Lille University School of Management, University Technical Institute of Lille).

- National School of Textile Arts and Industries (ENSAIT)

=== Flers-Château campus ===
This campus houses the premises of the National Higher Institute of Teaching and Education in Villeneuve-d'Ascq, Flers-Château district.

- National Higher Institute of Teaching and Education (INSPE)

== Research ==
The University of Lille is a member of the CURIF Group: Coordination of French research-intensive universities. The CURIF Group brings together the most important French universities in terms of research.

== Notable faculty and alumni ==
Several former professor or researchers from the University of Lille obtained the CNRS gold medal, the highest scientific distinction in France: Émile Borel (1954), Raoul Blanchard (1960), Paul Pascal (1966), Georges Chaudron (1969), Henri Cartan (1976), Jacques Le Goff (1991), Pierre Bourdieu (1993).

René Cassin won the Nobel Peace Prize in 1968.

Louis Pasteur was the first dean of the Faculty of Science, where he conducted his early research in microbiology.

Faustin-Archange Touadéra, who holds two doctorates in mathematics from the University of Lille and the Yaoundé University, was rector of University of Bangui from 2005 to 2008, then Prime Minister from 2008 to 2013, before being elected President of the Central African Republic in February 2016.

Notable faculty, staff and alumni in alphabetical order:

- Charles Barrois (1851–1939), professor, geologist.
- Angela Behelle (1971–), French novelist.
- Joseph Boussinesq (1842–1929), professor, mathematician, fluid mechanics specialist.
- Albert Calmette (1863–1933), co-inventor of the BCG vaccine.
- Albert Châtelet (1883–1960), professor, mathematician, politician.
- Louis Chauvel (1967–), professor, sociologist.
- Marc-Philippe Daubresse (1953–), mayor, member of parliament, French Minister for Youth and Active Solidarities.
- Jean Théodore Delacour (1890–1985), doctor, ornithologist.
- Marine Delplace (2000–), French singer.
- Louis Dollo (1857–1931), paleontologist.
- Claude Dubar (1945–2015), professor, sociology.
- Paul Dubreil (1904–1994), mathematician.
- Éric Dupond-Moretti (1961–), lawyer and politician, former French Minister of Justice.
- Joel Ferri (1959–), Oral and Maxillofacial Surgeon, academic and author.
- Philippe Froguel (1958–), French scientist specializing in the genetics of human diseases such as obesity and type 2 diabetes.
- Robert Gabillard (1926–2012), professor, co-inventor of Véhicule Automatique Léger VAL (driverless metro).
- Benoit Mandelbrot (1924–2010), mathematician, pioneer of fractal geometry.
- Alfred Mathieu Giard (1846–1908), zoologist and politician.
- Eve Gilles (2003–), Miss France 2024.
- Étienne Gilson (1884–1978), philosopher, historian and politician.
- Henri Gouhier (1898–1994), member of the French Academy.
- Camille Guérin (1872–1961), co-inventor of the BCG vaccine.
- Jean Hélion (1904–1987), painter.
- Jacky Hénin (1960–), politician.
- Victor Henry (1850–1907), linguist.
- Vladimir Jankélévitch (1903–1985), philosopher, musicologist.
- Joseph Kampé de Fériet (1893–1982), professor, physicist, chairman of mechanics from 1930 to 1969.
- Henri de Lacaze-Duthiers (1821–1901), professor, anatomiste, biologist, zoologist.
- Claude Auguste Lamy (1820–1878), professor, chemist, discoverer of the element thallium.
- Eugène Lefebvre (1878–1909), pioneering aviator.
- Pierre Macherey (1938–), philosopher.
- Szolem Mandelbrojt (1899–1983), professor, mathematician.
- Iris Mittenaere (1993–), Miss Universe 2016.
- Mohammad Ali Mojtahedi (1908–1997), Iranian university professor and lifetime principal of the Alborz High School in Tehran.
- Frédéric Nihous (1967–), French politician.
- Henri Padé (1863–1953), professor, mathematician.
- Paul Painlevé (1863–1933), professor, mathematician.
- Roger Salengro (1890–1936), minister.
- Jean Jacques Thomas (1954–), man of letters, academic, and author.
- Ernest Vessiot (1865–1952), professor, mathematician.
- Daniel Vincent (1874–1946), French politician and government minister.

== See also ==
- University of Lille Doctoral College
- University of Douai
