= Institut des techniques d'ingénieur de l'industrie =

iTii Logo

The Institut des Techniques d'Ingénieur de l'industrie or iTii is a French engineering institute which coordinates the delivery of Diplôme d'Ingénieur in Co-operative (Co-op) education with connection to academic partners (Grandes Ecoles, Universities) as well as professional partners. There are 22 of these institutions in France.

Each year, approximately 1,500 students get a 2nd cycle diplôme d'ingénieur from most prestigious French Grandes Ecoles (as Mines de Paris, Mines de Sainte-Etienne or Ecole Nationale Supérieure d'Arts et Métiers).

== History: Decomps Report ==
In 1980, France trained 12,000 engineers a year, and a polemic began on the need or not for multiplying the number of qualified engineers by 2, 3 even 5. In parallel, owing to a law of 1987, the way of the apprentissage (Co-op) opened gradually with the higher formations, progressively various supervision ministries approved the publication of lists of titles.

In 1989, Bernard Decomps, professor at the Higher Teacher training school of Cachan ENS Paris-Saclay, was the head of a working group on the requirements as engineers and returned his conclusions: existence of many technicians who are looking for evolution of training level, requirements as operational engineers having a better approach for industrial realities and to invest itself in particular in small and mid-size companies, report the deficiency for qualified engineers to manage the economic development and to stimulate industrial changes. The need for field engineers, trained by continuous vocational training or in initial formation, in partnership with companies, is then clearly identified.

== ITII today ==
The Instituts des techniques d'ingénieurs de l'industrie (Technical Institute of Engineers for Industry) (iTii) belongs to Formation d'Ingénieurs en Partenariat Engineers Education in Partnership (FIP). It is an entity which federates professional and academic partners to set up education strongly embedded in the industrial reality for new engineer profiles.

An iTii is an equal association between teaching partners and professional partners. Teaching partners are establishments entitled to deliver a Titre d'Ingénieur (Ecoles d'Ingénieurs, universities). Professional partners are companies (large or small) federated within professional branches. iTii were born with the NFI (or FIP) at the beginning of the 1990s, following the report of the tendency of the qualified engineers were deviating from the field of the production to the profit of management or administrative duties (see below). The idea to associate companies for the training of engineers thus answers the wish to form profiles of engineers more carried towards functions of production. The first iTii opened by the way of continuing education, the candidates were high-level technicians having at least five years of experience, that their company wished to promote with the statute of engineer. Since, courses by alternation developed and always with strong association with the professional partners during the education and the degree delivery. iTii degrees are delivered by establishments which were entitled by the Commission of the title of engineer (CTI). They are thus recognized by the State and companies as a diploma as engineer statute. In 2005, the 22 iTiis in France represented 1,200 graduates per year and 12,000 engineers had already graduated in the disciplines of mechanics, electrical and computing engineering, industrial engineering, materials engineering, telecommunications and information technologies, civil engineering, heat transfer engineering, etc.
