= Rapid transit =

High-capacity public transport

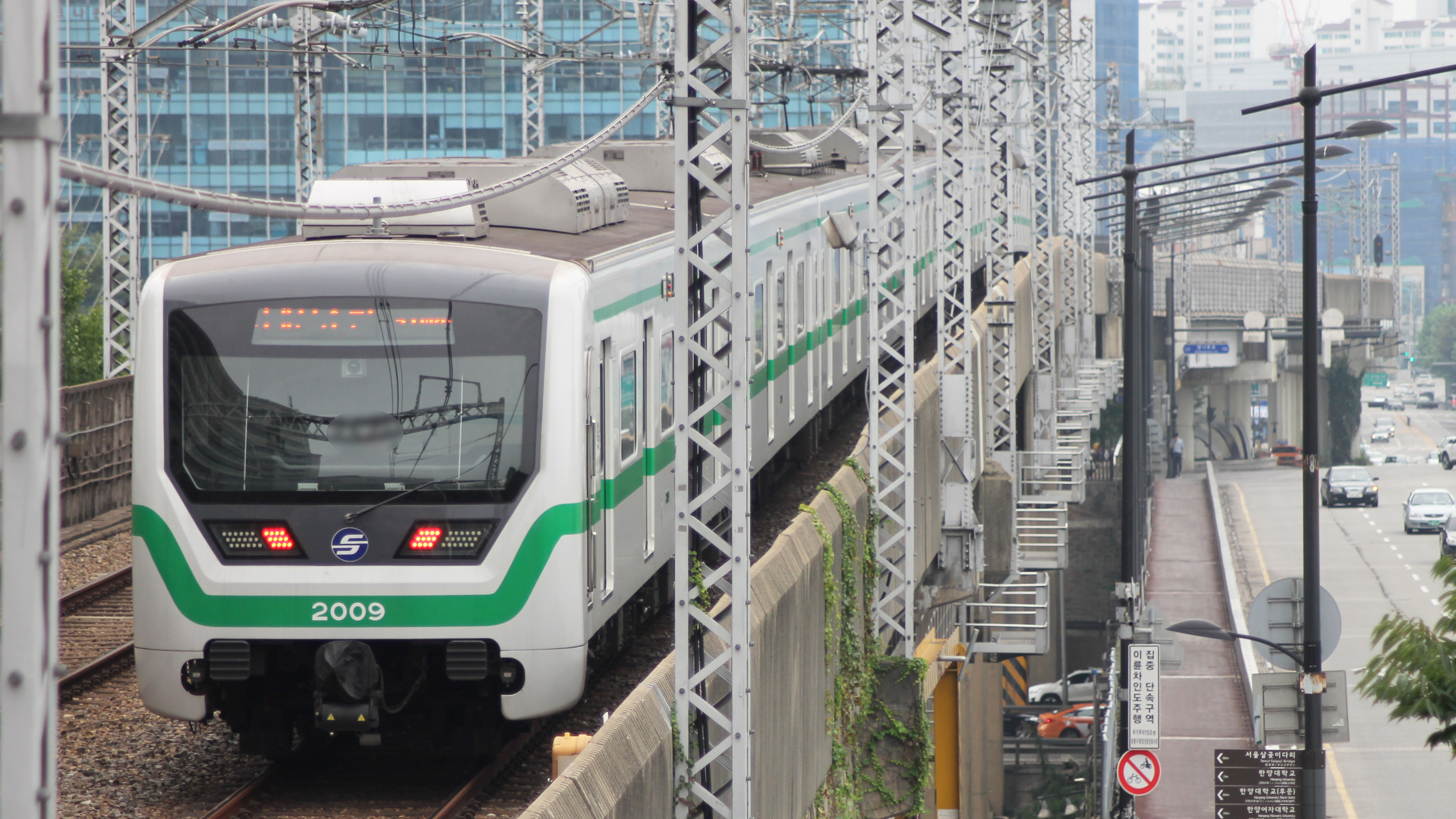
A Seoul Metro Class 2000 series 10-car EMU set 2x09 leaving Hanyang University Station

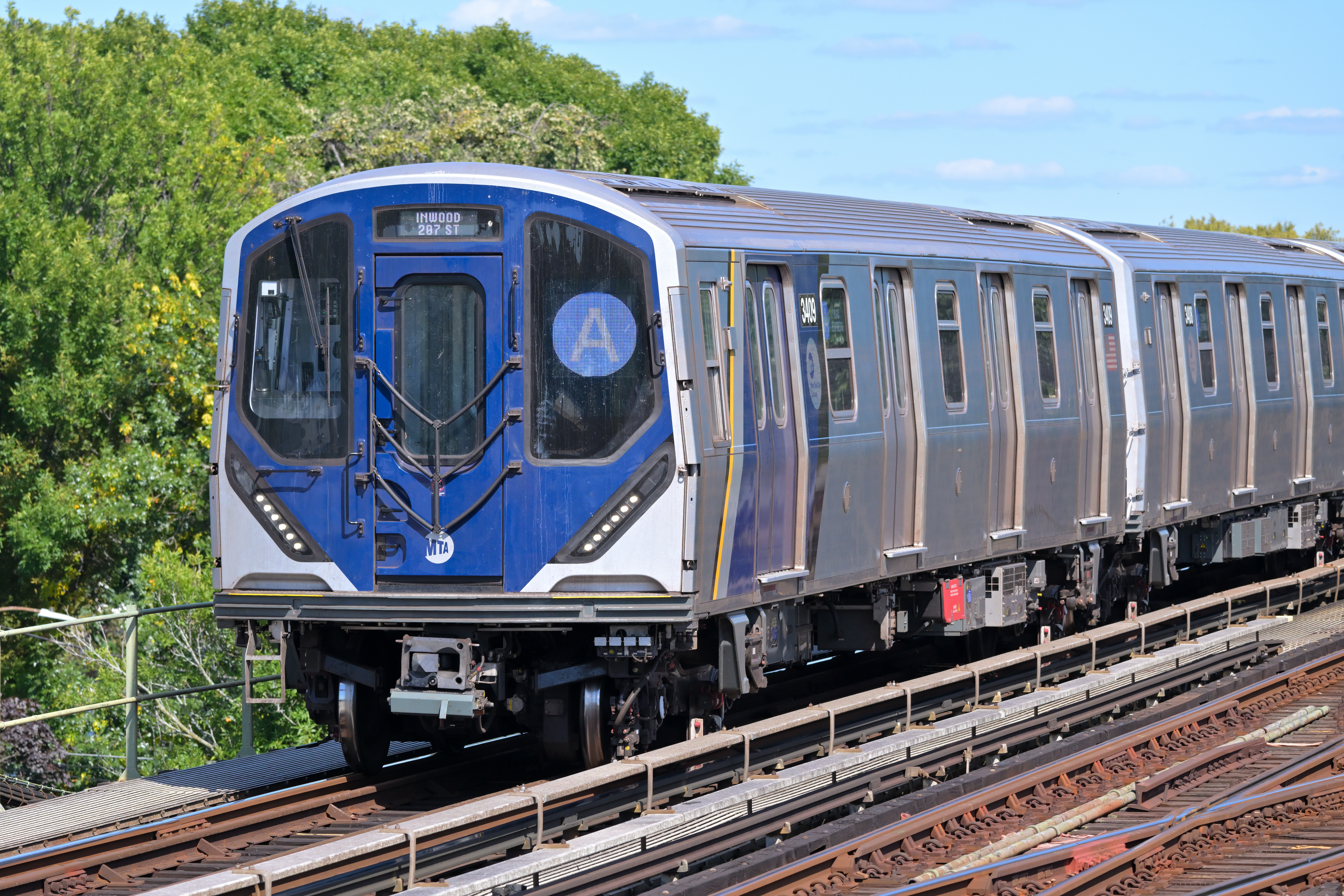
A R211 A train at 80th Street station of the New York City Subway

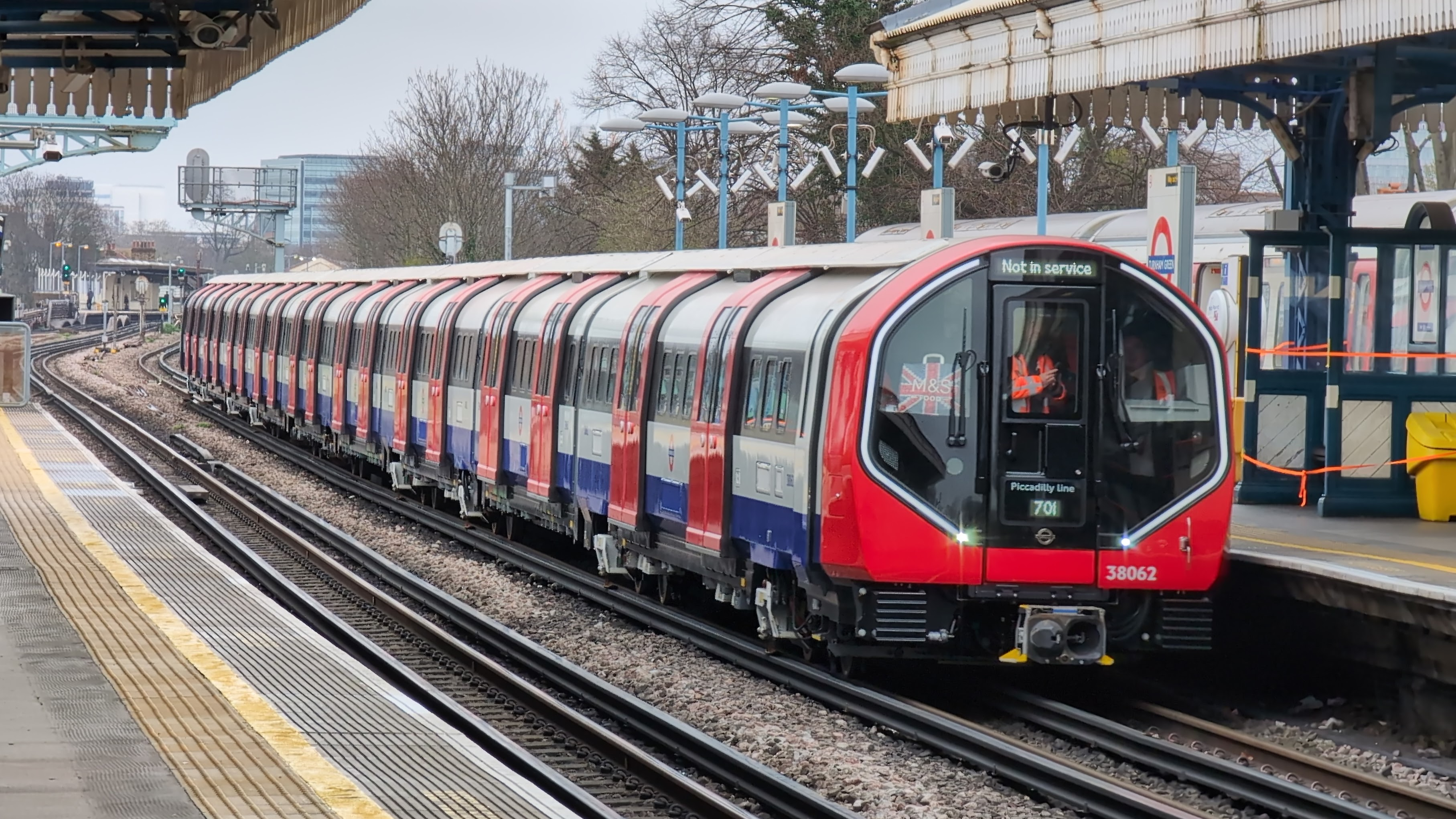
A test train of London Underground 2024 Stock at Turnham Green on the Piccadilly line

A Sydney Metro Metropolis Stock approaching Kellyville.

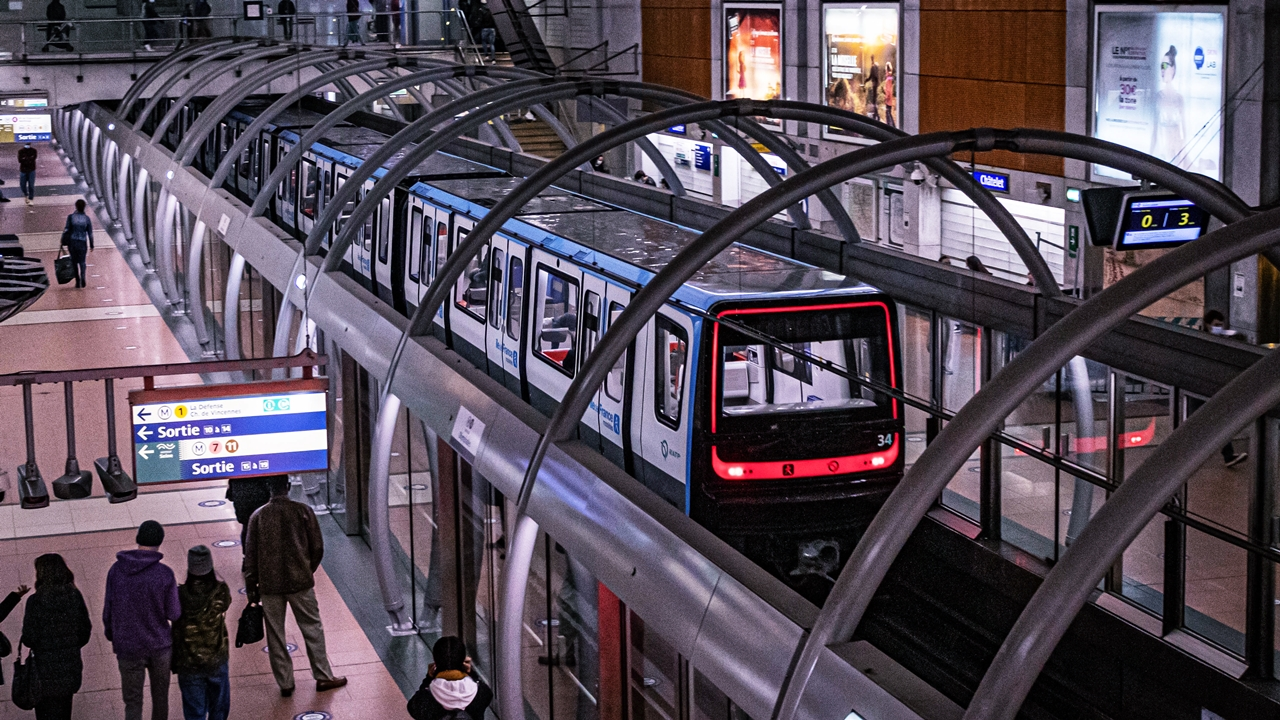
A Paris Metro MP 14 train at Châtelet on Line 14

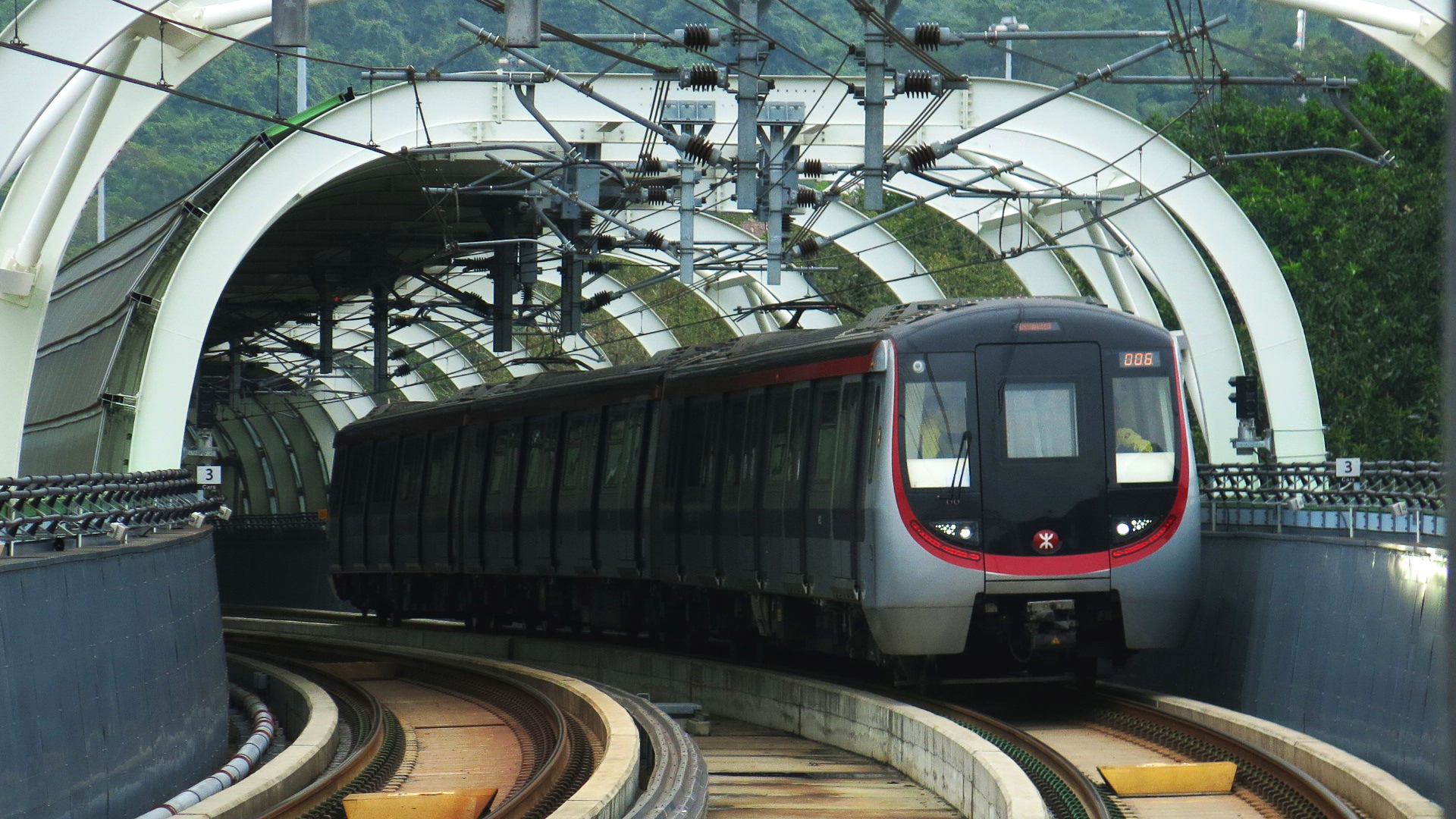
A S Train on the South Island Line on the Hong Kong MTR approaching Ocean Park

Rapid transit, mass rapid transit (MRT) or rail rapid transit (RRT) (Note: To distinguish it from "bus rapid transit".) and commonly referred to as metro, is a type of high-capacity public transport that is generally built in urban areas. A grade separated rapid transit line below ground surface through a tunnel can be regionally called a subway, tube, metro or underground. They are sometimes grade-separated on elevated railways, in which case some are referred to as elevated, el or L trains – short for "elevated" – or skytrains. A common alternative term for rapid transit in North America is heavy rail. (Note: "Heavy rail" term in North America refers to mass rapid transit (subway/metro) systems while "heavy rail" term refers globally to both main line/branch line freight rail and passenger rail (commuter, regional, intercity and high-speed) other than large-capacity metro and nationally/internationally operated but still a subject of debate.) Rapid transit systems are usually electric railways that, unlike buses or trams, operate on an exclusive right-of-way, which cannot be accessed by pedestrians or other vehicles.

Modern services on rapid transit systems are provided on designated lines between stations typically using electric multiple units on railway tracks. Some systems use guided rubber tires, magnetic levitation (maglev), or monorail. The stations typically have high platforms, without steps inside the trains, requiring custom-made trains in order to minimize gaps between train and platform. Some rapid transit systems have at-grade intersections between a rapid transit line and a road or between two rapid transit lines. Rapid transit lines have been increasingly automated, with many systems employing driverless trains along its routes.

Rapid transit systems are typically integrated with other public transport and often operated by the same public transport authorities. It is common for cities to integrate such systems alongside lower capacity commuter rail, through station transfers or even running the two along the same tracks.

The initial costs of rapid transport systems are often extremely high, and for the most part, are government funded projects. However, a well-designed system provides meaningful economic benefits for the city. Population density can increase due to a rapid transport system, and transit-oriented development may occur next to stations. Buildings in close proximity to stations also gain land value.

The world's first rapid transit system was the partially underground Metropolitan Railway which opened in 1863 using steam locomotives, and now forms part of the London Underground.

== Terminology ==
The term Metro is the most commonly used term for underground rapid transit systems used by non-native English speakers. Rapid transit systems may be named after the medium by which passengers travel in busy central business districts; the use of tunnels inspires names such as subway, underground, Untergrundbahn (U-Bahn) in German, or Tunnelbana (T-bana) in Swedish. The use of viaducts inspires names such as elevated (L or el), skytrain, overhead, overground or Hochbahn in German. One of these terms may apply to an entire system, even if a large part of the network, for example, in outer suburbs, runs at ground level.

=== Europe ===
==== Britain and Ireland ====
In most of Britain, a subway is a pedestrian underpass. The terms Underground and Tube are used for the London Underground. The North East England Tyne and Wear Metro, mostly overground, is known as the Metro. In Scotland, the Glasgow Subway underground rapid transit system is known as the Subway. In Ireland, the Dublin Area Rapid Transit is despite the name considered a commuter rail due to usage of mainline railways.

==== Mainland ====
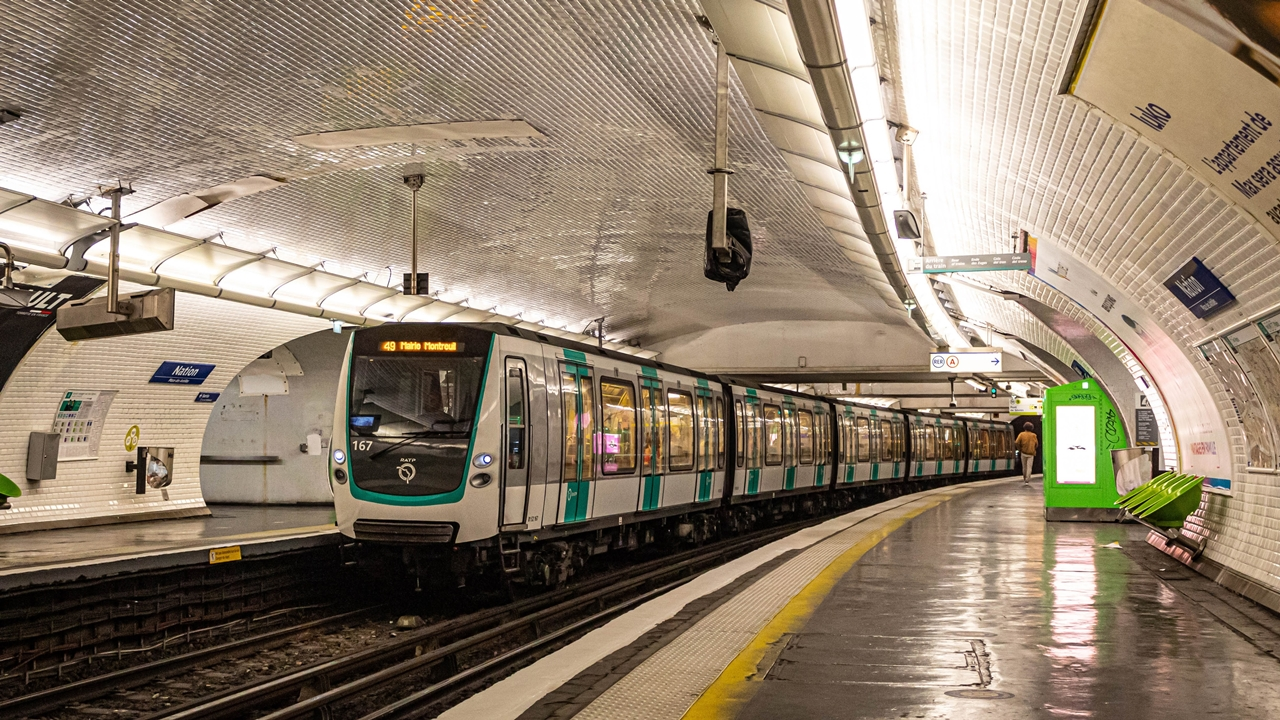
Nation station, on Line 9 of the Paris Métro

In France, large cities, such as Paris, Marseille, Toulouse and Lyon, use the term métro. Also the smaller cities of Lille and Rennes have a light metro. Furthermore, Brussels in Belgium, and Amsterdam and Rotterdam in the Netherlands also use métro or metro for their systems.

Several Southern European countries also use the term metro (Iberian Peninsula) or metropolitana (Italy) for rapid transit. In Spain, such systems are present in Madrid, Barcelona, Bilbao and Valencia. In Portugal, Lisbon, Porto and Almada (which is part of the Lisbon metropolitan area but has a separate light-rail system) have a metro, while Coimbra has a Bus Rapid Transit system branded as a metro. The Italian cities of Catania, Genoa, Milan, Naples, Rome, Brescia and Turin also have rapid transit systems.

In Germany and Austria their rapid transit is known as U-Bahn, which are often supported by S-Bahn systems. In Germany, U-Bahn systems exist in Berlin, Hamburg, Munich, Nuremberg and Fürth, while in Austria such a system exists in Vienna. In addition, the small, car-free town of Serfaus in the Austrian state of Tyrol also features a short U-Bahn line. There are no U-Bahn systems in the German-speaking part of Switzerland, but the city of Lausanne has its own, small metro system. In Zurich, Switzerland's largest city, a project for a U-Bahn network was stopped by a referendum in the 1970s and instead its S-Bahn system was developed further. Other Central European countries also have metro lines, for example in the cities of Budapest (Hungary), where it is called metró, Prague (Czech Republic) and Warsaw (Poland) – the latter two systems also use the term metro.

In Eastern Europe, metro systems are in operation in Minsk (Belarus, called mietrapaliten), Kyiv (Ukraine, called metropoliten), Kharkiv (Ukraine), Dnipro (Ukraine), Moscow (Russia, called metropoliten), Saint Petersburg (Russia), Kazan (Russia), Nizhny Novgorod (Russia), Samara (Russia), Yekaterinburg (Russia), Novosibirsk (Russia).

In Southeastern European countries, the term metro is common for rapid transit systems, which exist in Athens and Thessaloniki (Greece), Belgrade (Serbia, currently under construction), Sofia (Bulgaria), Istanbul (Turkey, called metro) and Baku (Azerbaijan).

In Northern Europe, rapid transit systems are called metro in Copenhagen (Denmark) and Helsinki (Finland), while they are referred to as T-bane (tunnelbane) in Oslo (Norway) and tunnelbana in Stockholm (Sweden).

=== North America ===
Various terms are used for rapid transit systems around North America. The term metro is primarily used to describe non-English systems, such as the Mexico City Metro and the Montreal Metro, although the term is often used in English as well, as is the case for Los Angeles Metro Rail and the Washington Metro, among others. The term "subway" is more commonly used to describe rail rapid transit in English, despite few systems being known by the term. Systems known for their elevated character are often referred to as "the El", "the L", or as a "skytrain," with examples including the Chicago "L" and Vancouver SkyTrain. Metro is also used as a shortened reference to a metropolitan area, with some systems referencing this in their names, with the REM (Réseau express métropolitain) in Montreal and Metra (Metropolitan Rail) suburban rail in Chicago (despite the latter not being rapid transit at all). Boston's subway system is known locally as "The T". In Atlanta, the Metropolitan Atlanta Rapid Transit Authority goes by the acronym "MARTA." In the San Francisco Bay Area, residents refer to Bay Area Rapid Transit by its acronym "BART".

The New York City Subway is referred to simply as "the subway", despite 40% of the system running above ground. The term "L" or "El" is not used for elevated lines in general as the lines in the system are already designated with letters and numbers. The "L" train or L (New York City Subway service) refers specifically to the 14th Street–Canarsie Local line, and not other elevated trains. Similarly, the Toronto Subway is referred to as "the subway", with some of its system also running above ground. These are the only two North American systems that are primarily called "subways".

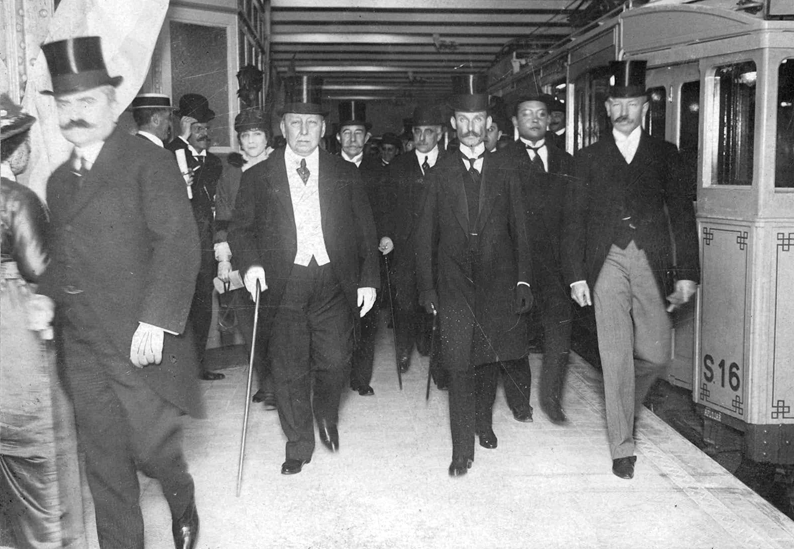
Inauguration of the Buenos Aires Underground in 1913.

=== Latin America ===
In Buenos Aires the first stretch of underground urban railway opened in 1913, as part of Line A. Vice president Victorino de la Plaza attended the inauguration.

=== Asia ===
In most of Southeast Asia and in Taiwan, rapid transit systems are primarily known by the acronym MRT. The meaning varies from one country to another. In Indonesia, the acronym stands for Moda Raya Terpadu or Integrated Mass [Transit] Mode in English. In the Philippines, it stands for Metro Rail Transit. Two underground lines use the term subway. In Thailand, it stands for Metropolitan Rapid Transit, previously using the Mass Rapid Transit name. Outside of Southeast Asia, Taichung, Kaohsiung and Taoyuan, Taiwan, have their own MRT systems which stands for Mass Rapid Transit, as with Singapore and Malaysia. In Hong Kong, rapid transit systems are referred to as MTR, short for Mass Transit Railway.

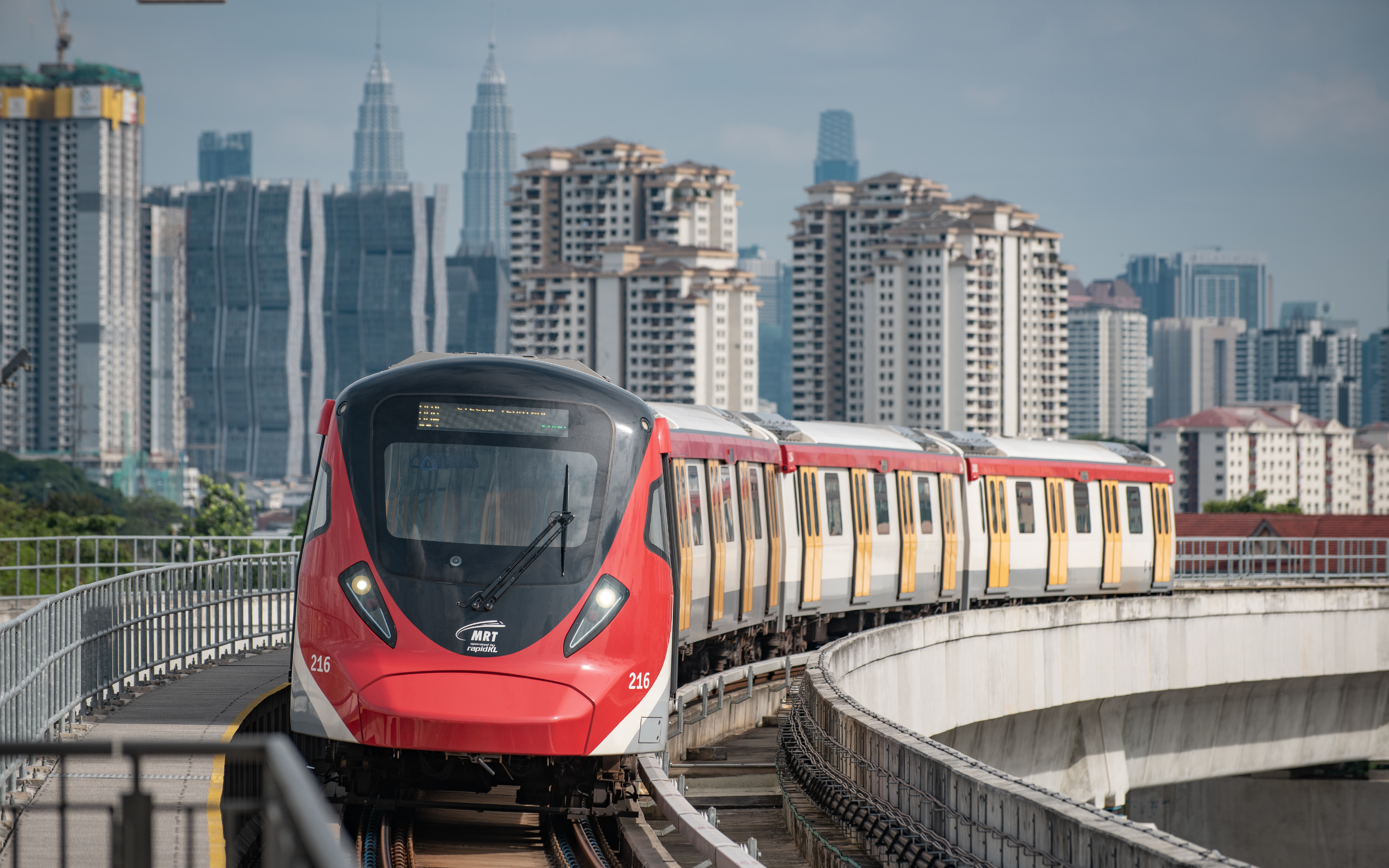
Putrajaya Line in Kuala Lumpur

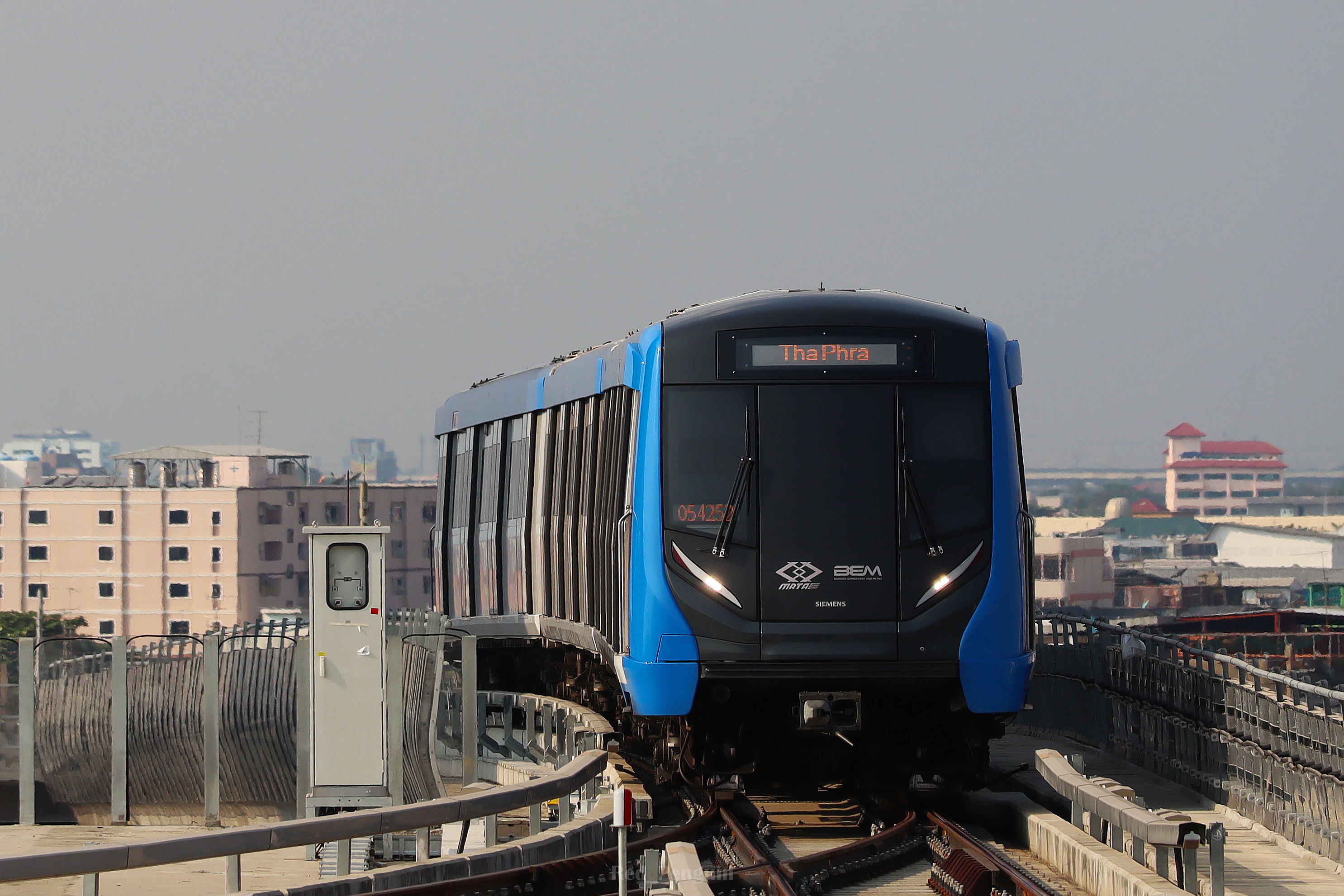
Blue Line in Bangkok

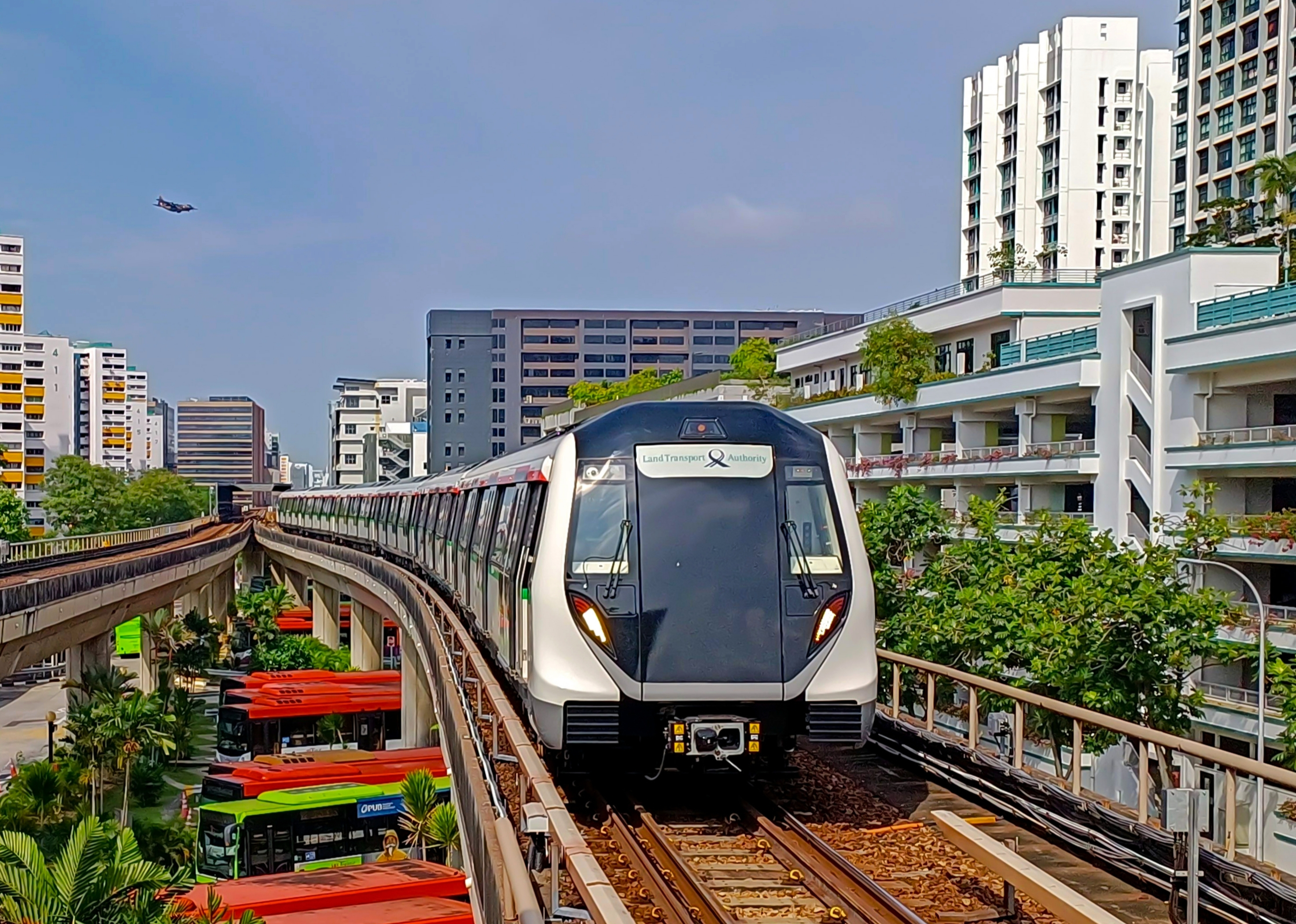
East-West Line in Singapore

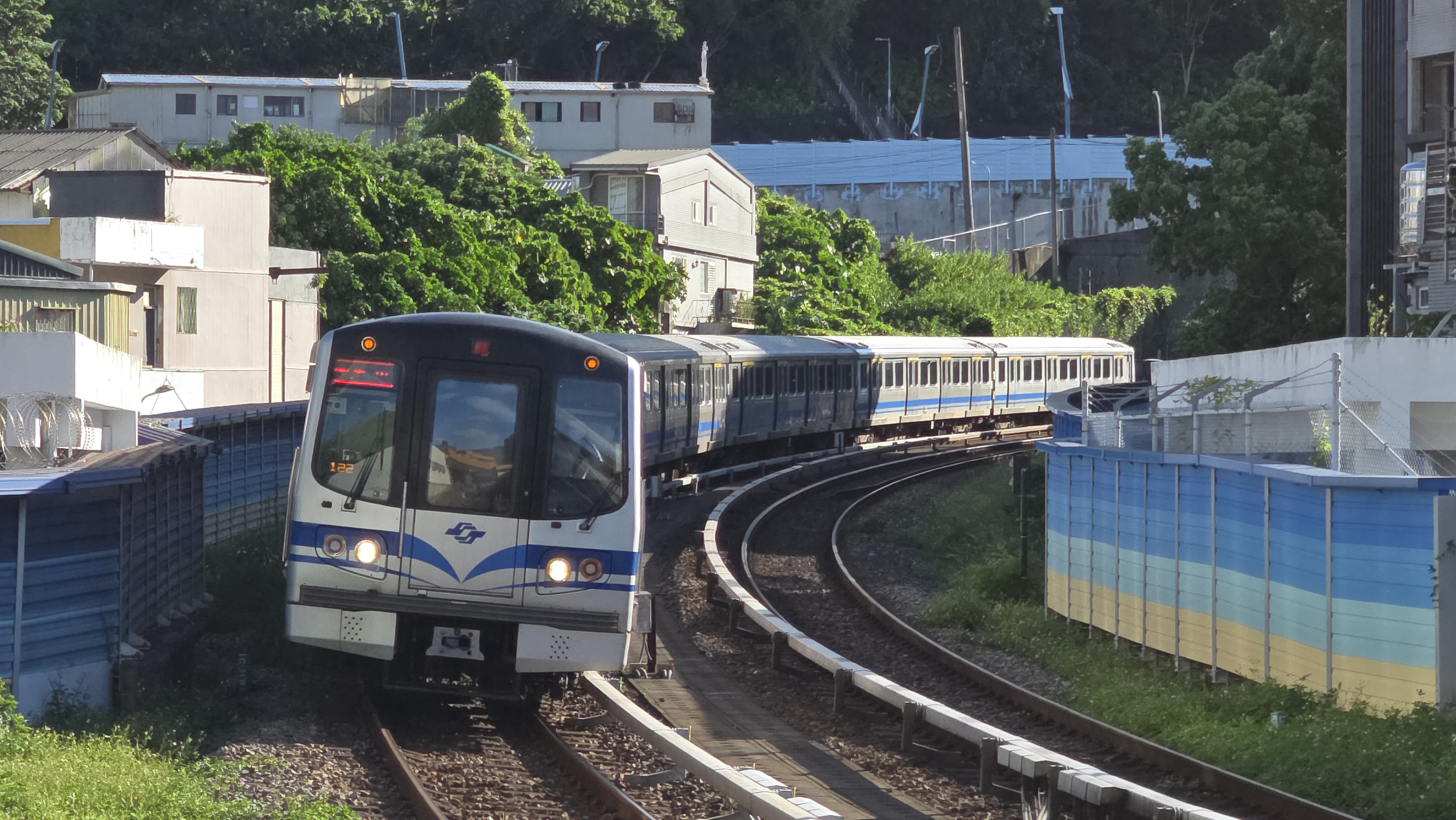
Tamsui–Xinyi Line in Taipei

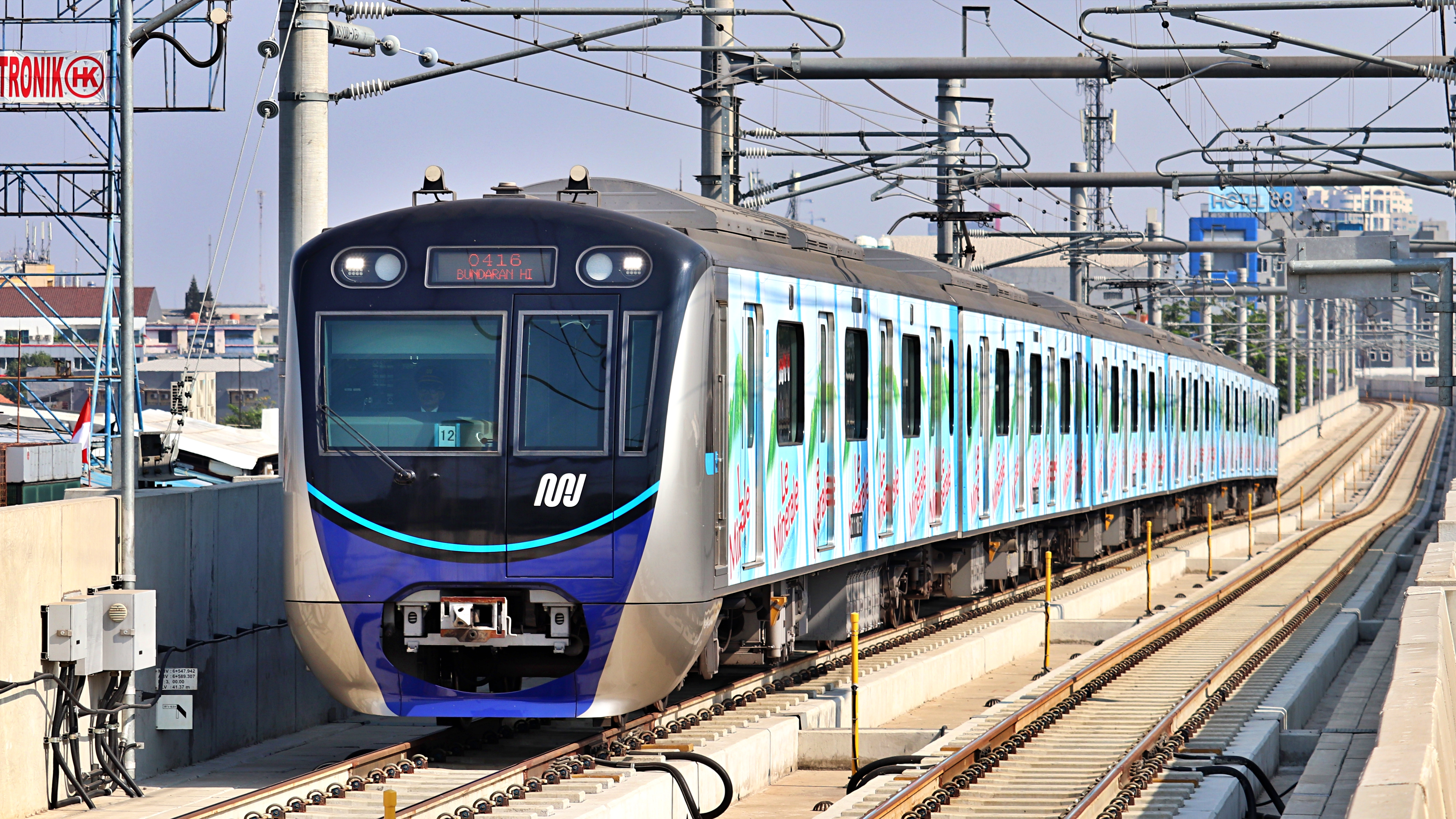
North–South Line in Jakarta

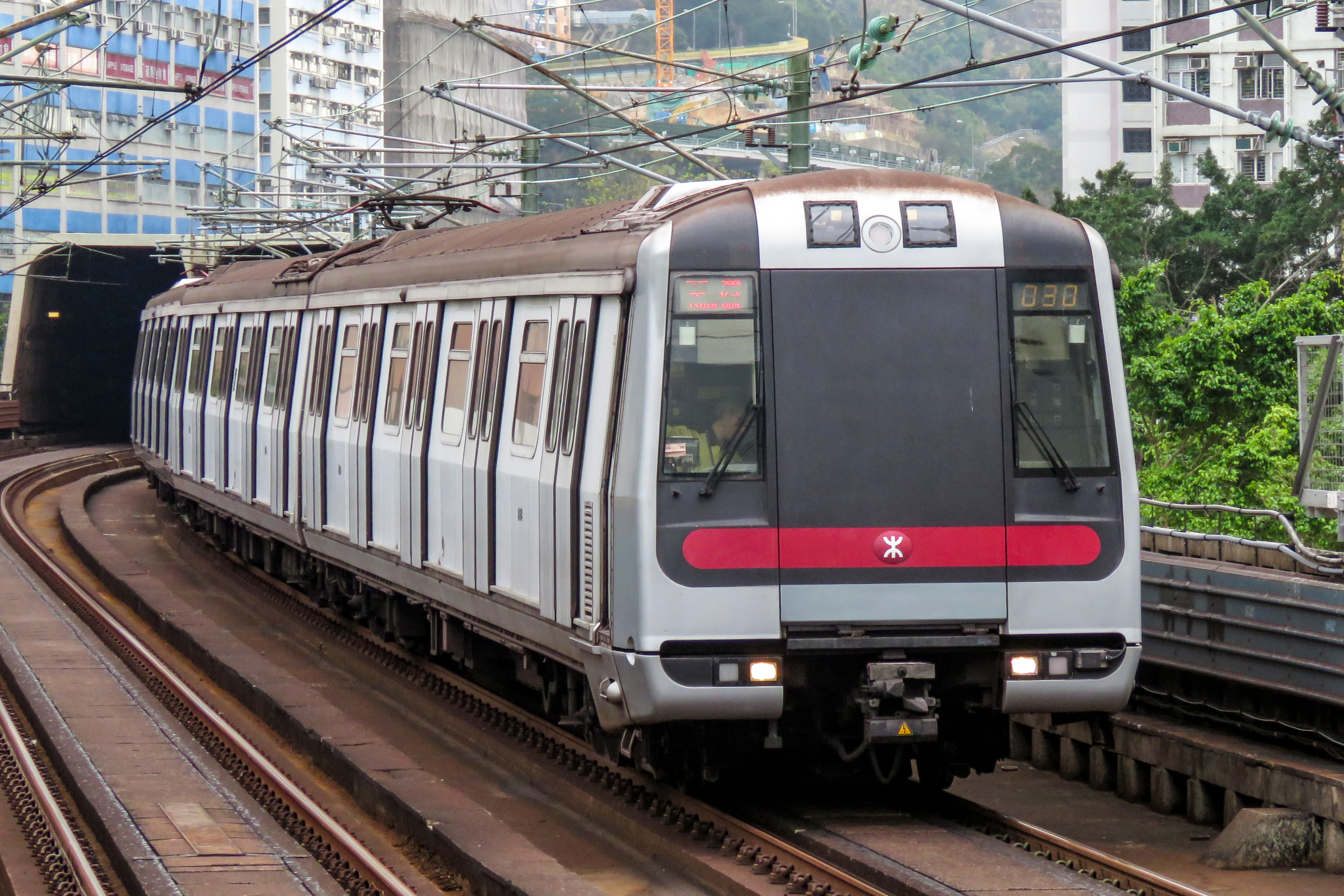
Tsuen Wan Line in Hong Kong

=== Broader definition ===
In general rapid transit is a synonym for "metro" type transit, though sometimes rapid transit is defined to include "metro", commuter trains and grade-separated light rail. Also high-capacity bus-based transit systems can have features similar to "metro" systems.

== History ==
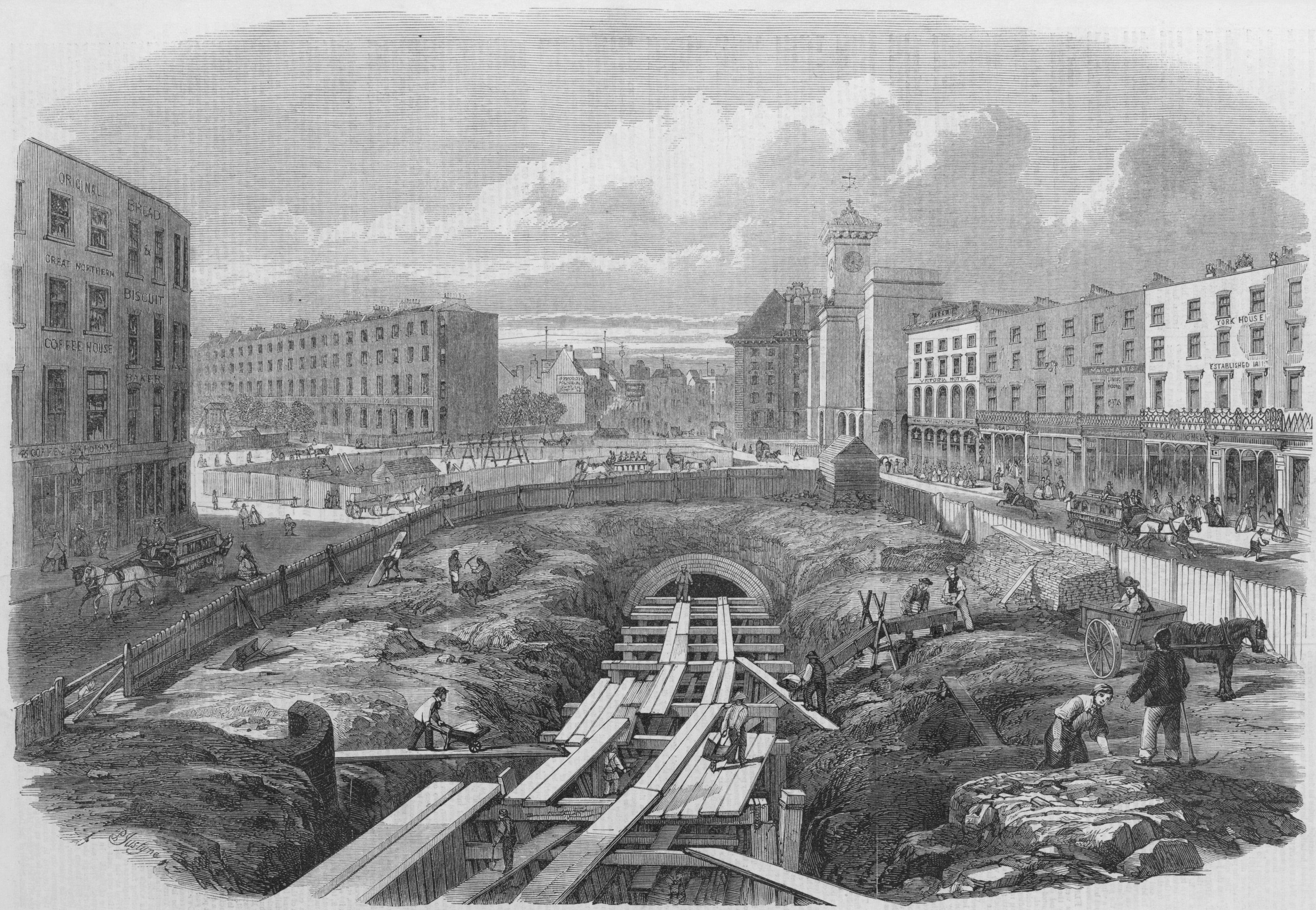
Construction of London's Metropolitan Railway at King's Cross St Pancras in 1861

The opening of London's steam-hauled Metropolitan Railway in 1863 marked the beginning of rapid transit. Initial experiences with steam engines, despite ventilation, were unpleasant. Experiments with pneumatic railways failed in their extended adoption by cities.

In 1868, New York opened the elevated West Side and Yonkers Patent Railway, initially a cable-hauled line using stationary steam engines.

In 1890, the City & South London Railway was the first electric-traction rapid transit railway, which was also fully underground. Prior to opening, the line was to be called the "City and South London Subway", thus introducing the term Subway into railway terminology. Both railways, alongside others, were eventually merged into London Underground. The 1893 Liverpool Overhead Railway was designed to use electric traction from the outset.

The technology quickly spread to other cities in Europe, the United States, Argentina, and Canada, with some railways being converted from steam and others being designed to be electric from the outset. Budapest, Chicago, Glasgow, Boston, Buenos Aires and New York City all converted or purpose-designed and built electric rail services.

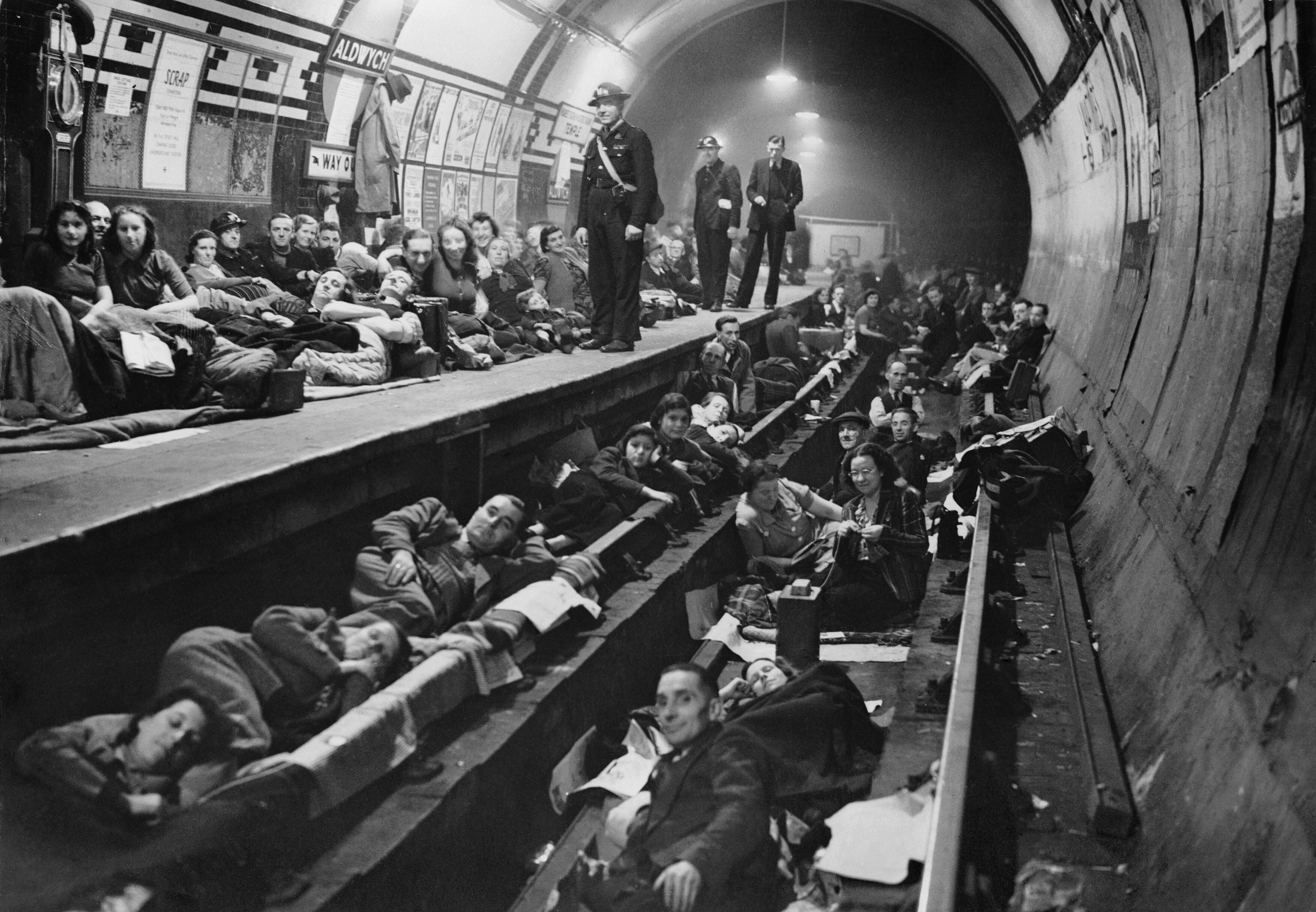
Aldwych tube station in London being used as a bomb shelter in 1940

Advancements in technology have allowed new automated services. Hybrid solutions have also evolved, such as tram-train and premetro, which incorporate some of the features of rapid transit systems.

Since the 1960s, many new systems have been introduced in Europe, Asia and Latin America. In the 21st century, most new expansions and systems are located in Asia, with China becoming the world's leader in metro expansion, operating some of the largest and busiest systems while possessing almost 60 cities that are operating, constructing or planning a rapid transit system.

== Operation ==
Rapid transit is used for local transport in cities, agglomerations, and metropolitan areas to transport large numbers of people often short distances at high frequency. The extent of the rapid transit system varies greatly between cities, with several transport strategies.

Some systems may extend only to the limits of the inner city, or to its inner ring of suburbs with trains making frequent station stops. The outer suburbs may then be reached by a separate commuter rail network where more widely spaced stations allow higher speeds. In some cases the differences between urban rapid transit and suburban systems are not clear.

Rapid transit systems may be supplemented by other systems such as trolleybuses, regular buses, trams, or commuter rail. This combination of transit modes serves to offset certain limitations of rapid transit such as limited stops and long walking distances between outside access points. Bus or tram feeder systems transport people to rapid transit stops.

=== Records ===
As of 2021, China has the largest number of rapid transit systems in the world—40 in number, running on over 4,500 km (2,800 miles) of track—and was responsible for most of the world's rapid-transit expansion in the 2010s. The world's longest (by route length) and busiest (by annual ridership) systems are Beijing Subway and Shanghai Metro.

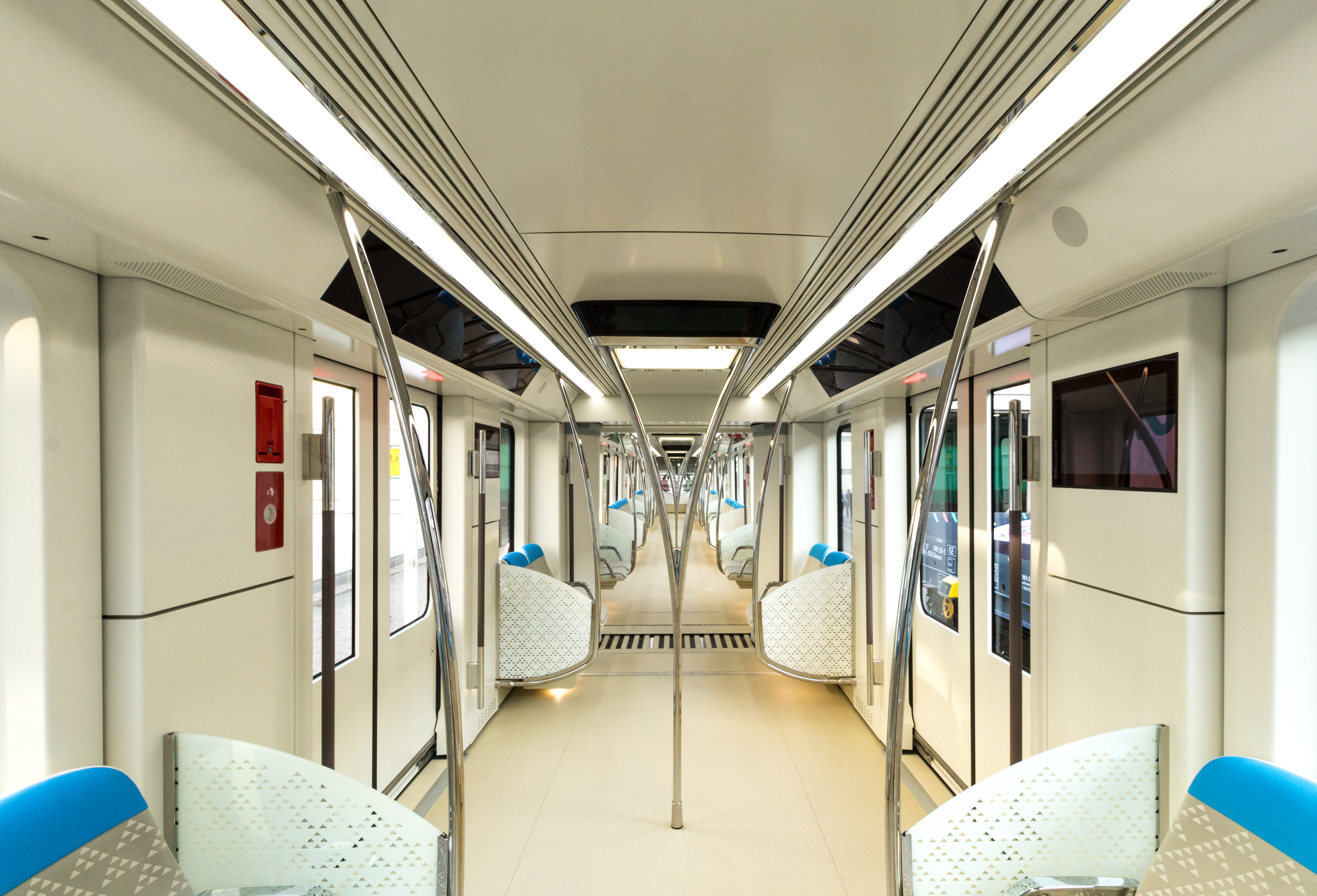
Riyadh Metro spans 176 kilometers across six lines and includes 85 stations, the longest fully automated system globally.

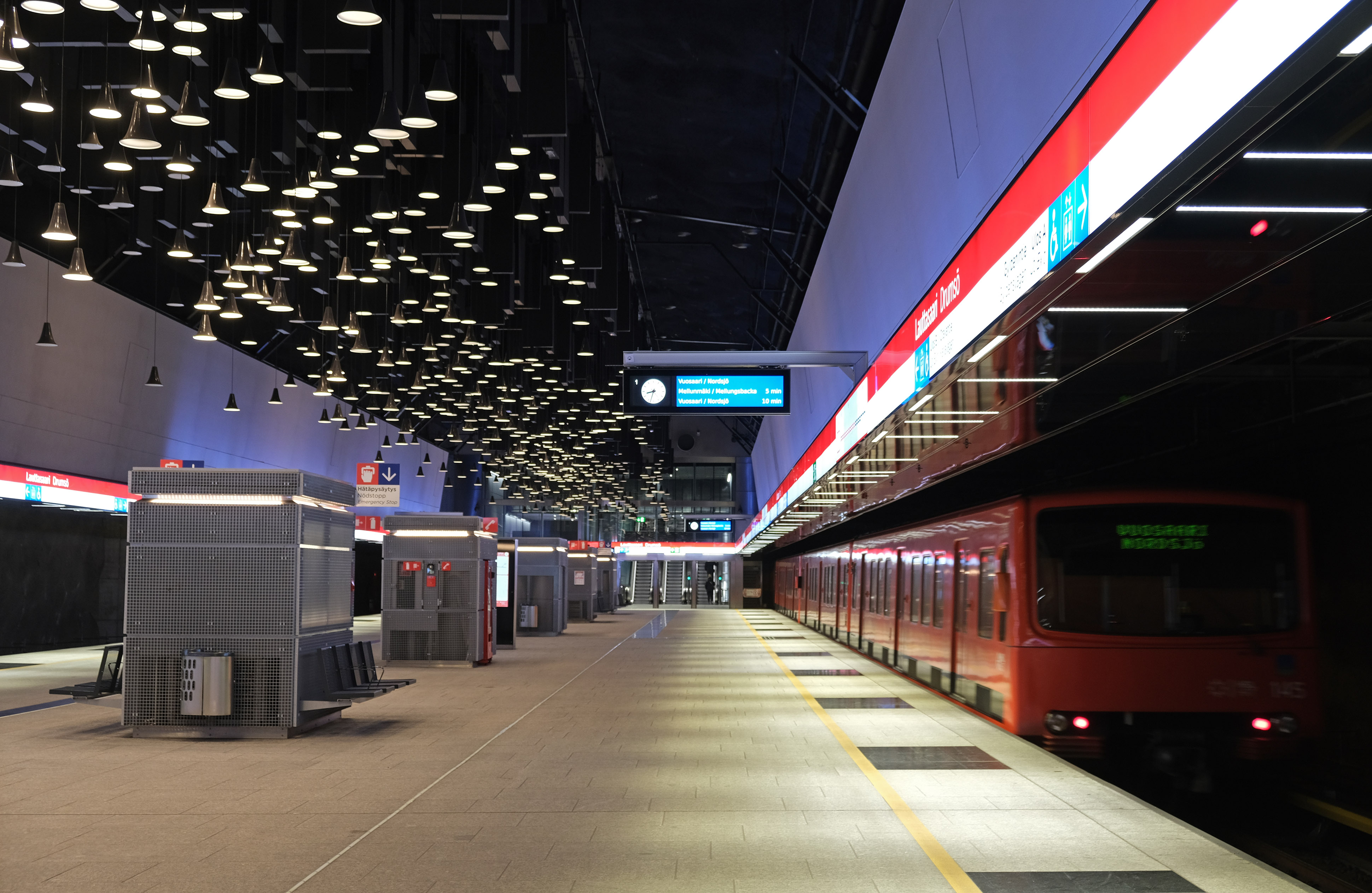
Helsinki Metro is the northernmost metro system in the world.

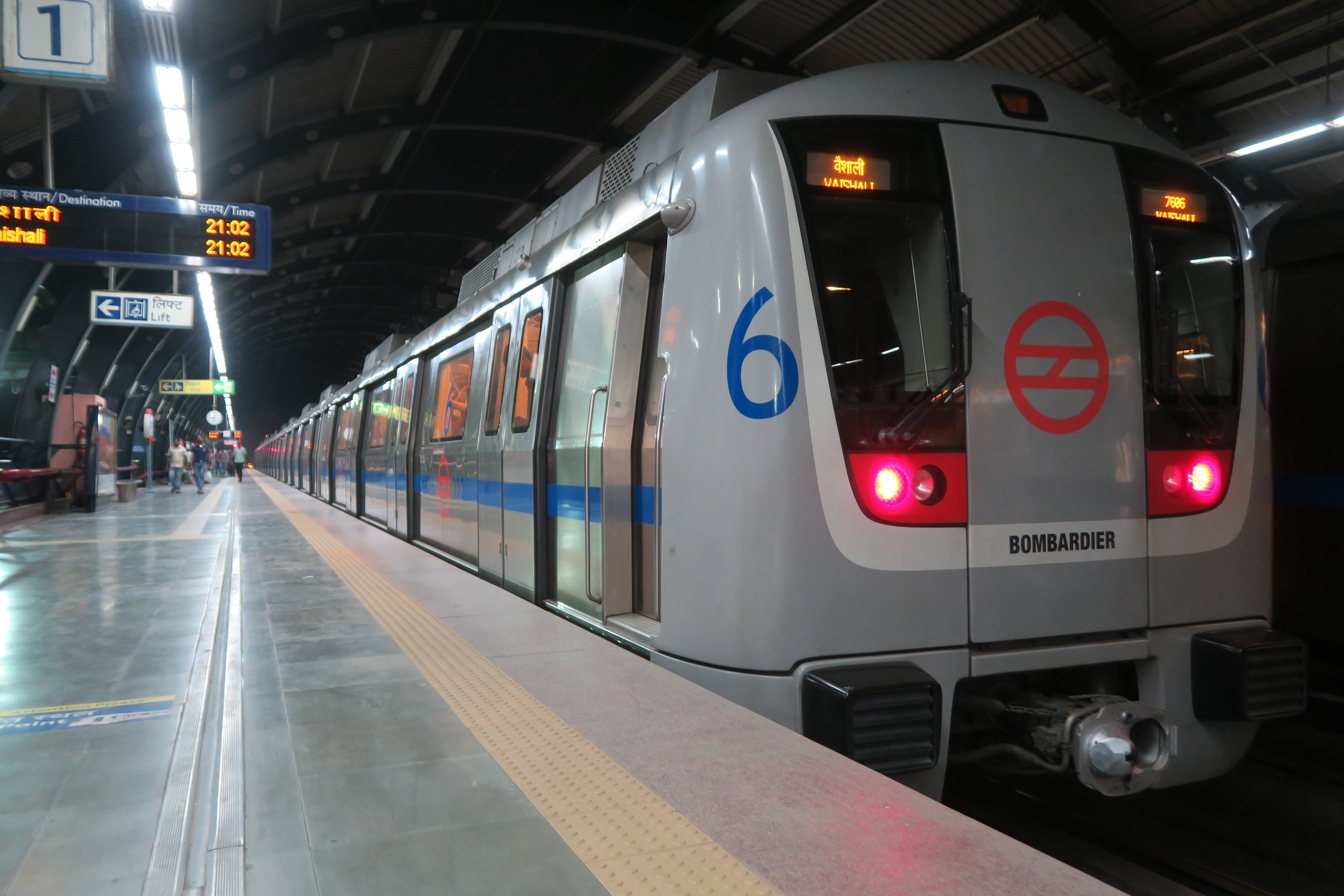
Delhi Metro is the longest metro system in India and the 16th longest metro system in the world, with 395 kilometers of metro track.

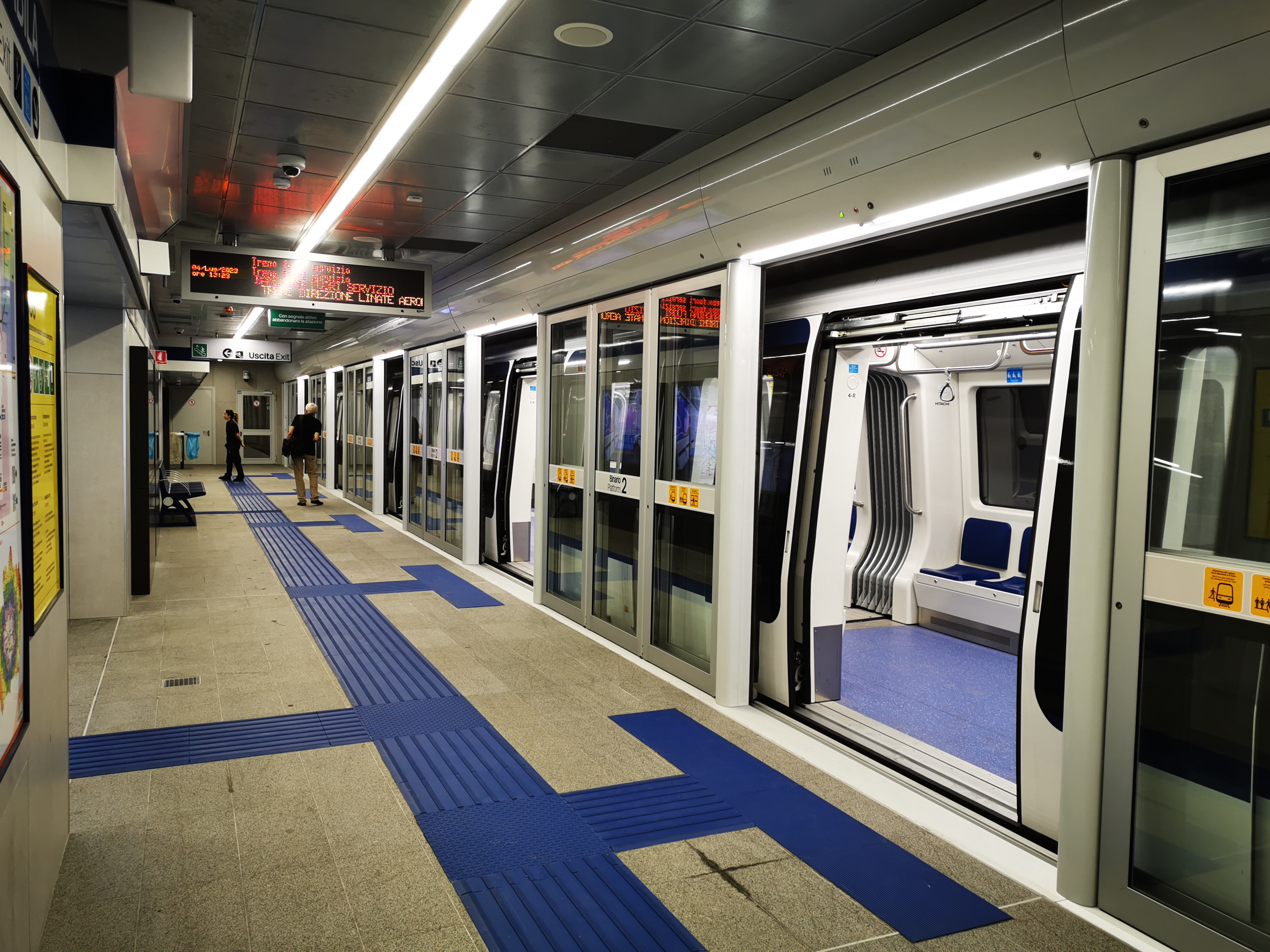
Milan Metro is the largest rapid transit system in Italy and the 8th longest in Europe.

=== Lines ===
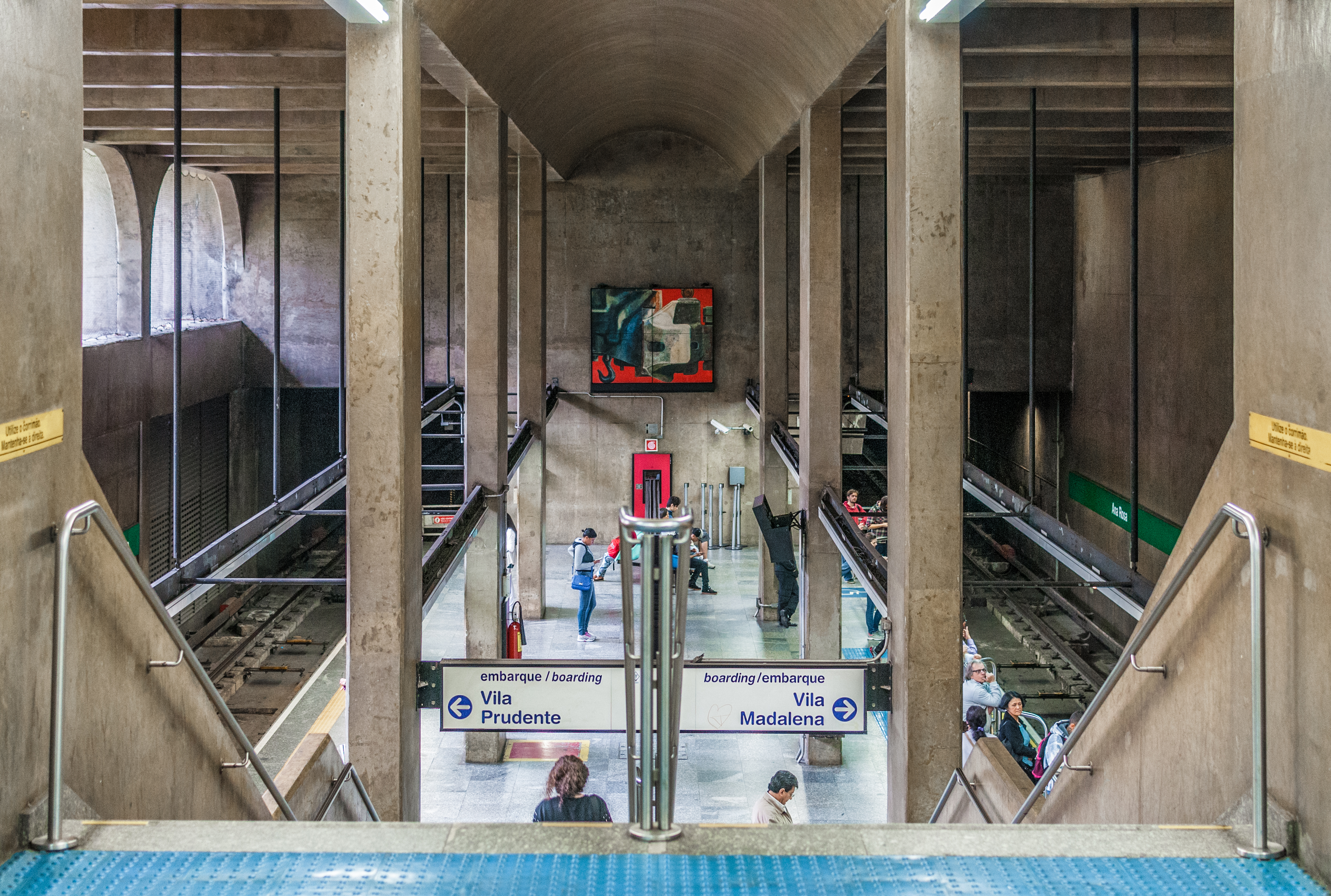
Ana Rosa station platform, line 2 in São Paulo Metro

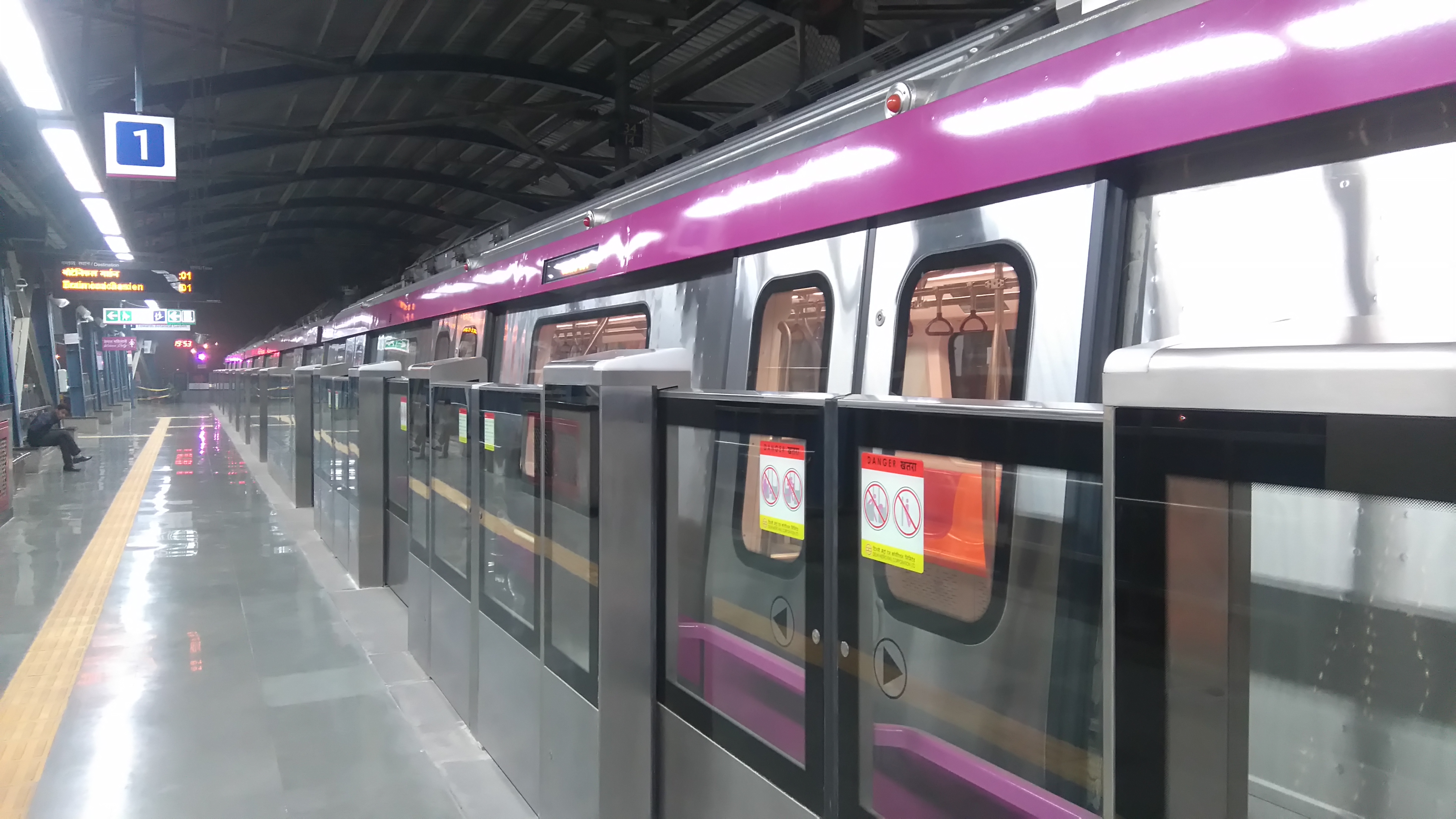
A train on the Magenta Line of the Delhi Metro. Trains on the Delhi Metro are color-coded to indicate different service lines.

Each rapid transit system consists of one or more lines, or circuits. Each line is serviced by at least one specific route with trains stopping at all or some of the line's stations. Most systems operate several routes, and distinguish them by colors, names, numbering, or a combination thereof. Some lines may share track with each other for a portion of their route or operate solely on their own right-of-way. Often a line running through the city center forks into two or more branches in the suburbs, allowing a higher service frequency in the center. This arrangement is used by many systems, such as the Copenhagen Metro, the Milan Metro, the Oslo Metro, the Istanbul Metro and the New York City Subway.

Alternatively, there may be a single central terminal (often shared with the central railway station), or multiple interchange stations between lines in the city center, for instance in the Prague Metro. The London Underground and Paris Metro are densely built systems with a matrix of crisscrossing lines throughout the cities. The Chicago 'L' has most of its lines converging on The Loop, the main business, financial, and cultural area. Some systems have a circular line around the city center connecting to radially arranged outward lines, such as the Moscow Metro's Koltsevaya Line and Beijing Subway's Line 10.

The capacity of a line is obtained by multiplying the car capacity, the train length, and the service frequency. Heavy rapid transit trains might have six to fourteen cars, while lighter systems may use four or fewer. Cars have a capacity of 100 to 150 passengers, varying with the seated to standing ratio – more standing gives higher capacity. The minimum time interval between trains is shorter for rapid transit than for mainline railways owing to the use of communications-based train control: the minimum headway can reach 90 seconds, but many systems typically use 120 seconds to allow for recovery from delays. Typical capacity lines allow 1,200 people per train, giving 36,000 passengers per hour per direction. However, much higher capacities are attained in East Asia with ranges of 75,000 to 85,000 people per hour achieved by MTR Corporation's urban lines in Hong Kong.

==== Network topologies ====
Rapid transit topologies are determined by a large number of factors, including geographical barriers, existing or expected travel patterns, construction costs, politics, and historical constraints. A transit system is expected to serve an area of land with a set of lines, which consist of shapes summarized as "I", "L", "U", "S", and "O" shapes or loops. Geographical barriers may cause chokepoints where transit lines must converge (for example, to cross a body of water), which are potential congestion sites but also offer an opportunity for transfers between lines.

Ring lines provide good coverage, connect between the radial lines and serve tangential trips that would otherwise need to cross the typically congested core of the network. A rough grid pattern can offer a wide variety of routes while still maintaining reasonable speed and frequency of service. A study of the 15 world largest subway systems suggested a universal shape composed of a dense core with branches radiating from it.

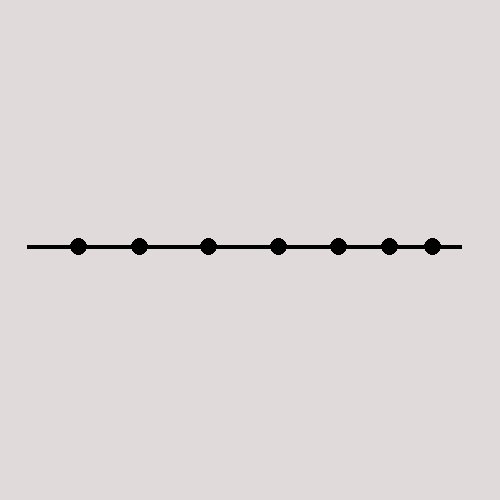
Line, e.g. Almaty, Austin, Baltimore, Cleveland, Dhaka, Gwangju, Hanoi, Hiroshima, Honolulu, Izmir, Jakarta, Kazan, Lima, Maracaibo, Navi Mumbai, Quito, Sydney, Thessaloniki, Valencia (Venezuela), Yekaterinburg

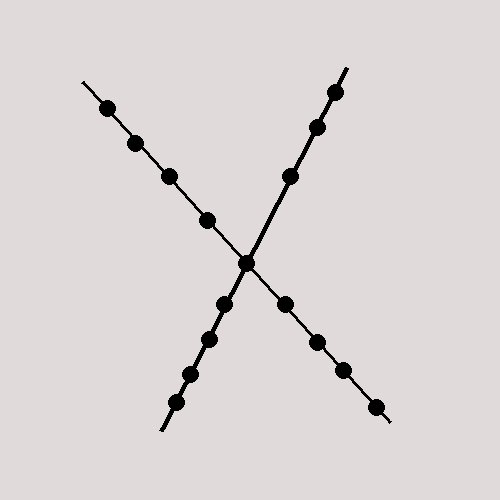
Cross, e.g. Ahmedabad, Atlanta, Bangalore, Hohhot, Incheon, Kaohsiung, Kyoto, Luoyang, Nagpur, Panama City, Philadelphia (SEPTA), Pune, Pyongyang, Rotterdam, Santo Domingo, Sendai, Warsaw.

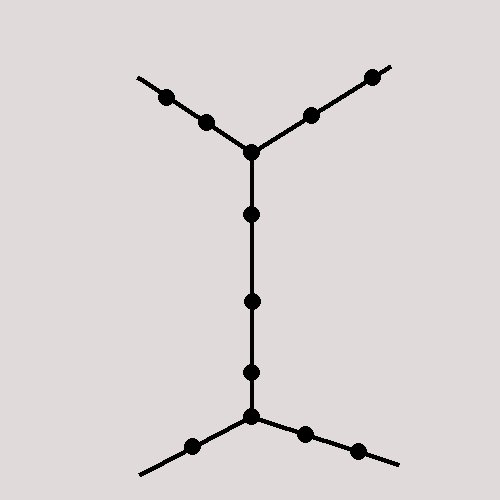
X-shaped, e.g. Algiers, Amsterdam, Bilbao, Brasília, Brussels, Helsinki, Miami, Nizhny Novgorod, Recife, Rio de Janeiro, San Francisco Bay Area, Stockholm, Thessaloniki, Yokohama

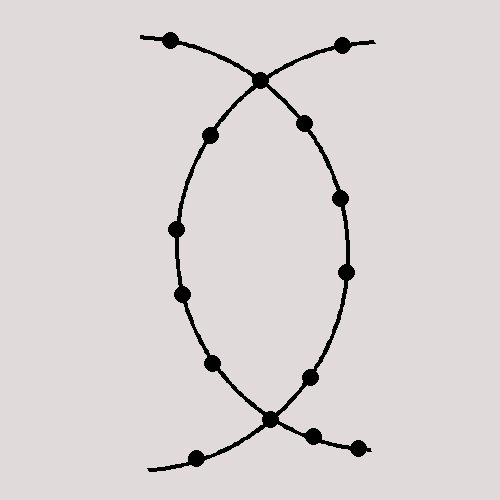
Two crossing paths (air bladder), e.g. Chennai, Dubai, Kobe, Lille, Marseille, Monterrey, Montreal, Nanchang, Nuremberg, Rotterdam, Toronto

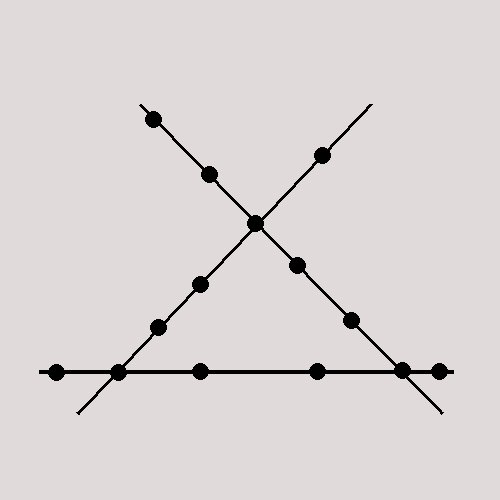
Secant, e.g. Athens, Budapest, Busan, Cairo, Guadalajara, Kharkiv, Kyiv, Hyderabad, Lisbon, Milan, Munich, Philadelphia (including PATCO), Prague, Rome, São Paulo, Tashkent

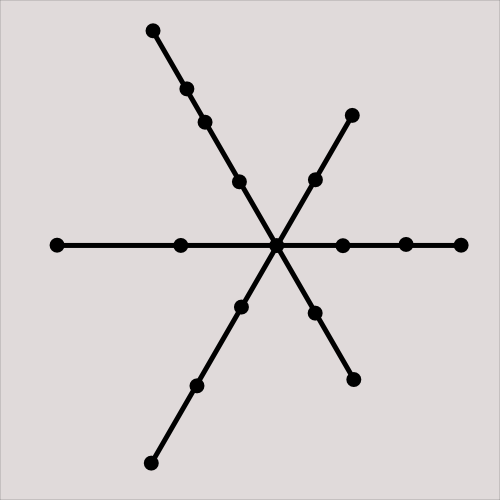
Radial, e.g. Ankara, Boston, Budapest, Buenos Aires, Chicago, Daegu, Doha, Los Angeles, Sapporo, Sydney, Vancouver, Washington, D.C.

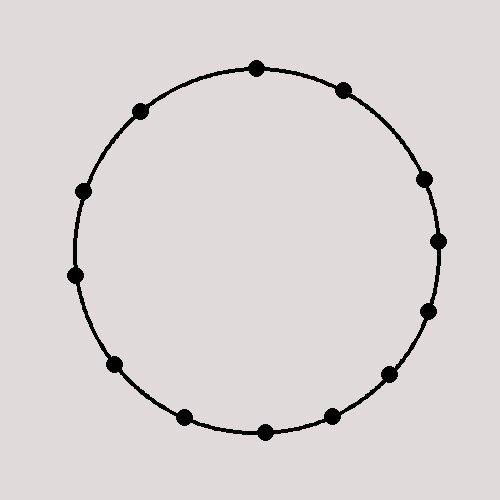
Circle, e.g. Detroit, Glasgow

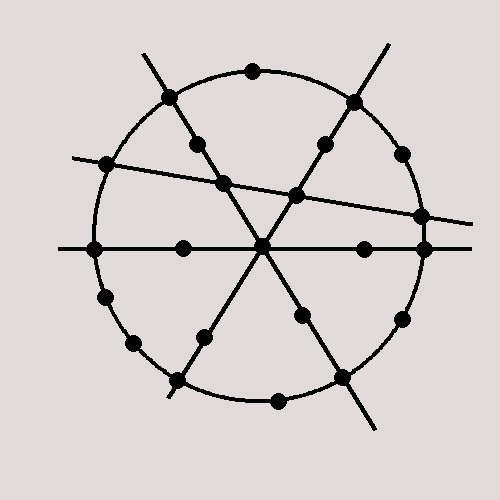
Circle-radial, e.g. Bangkok, Beijing, Bucharest, Chengdu, Chongqing, Copenhagen, Delhi, Guangzhou, Hamburg, London, Madrid, Moscow, Nagoya, Paris, Seoul, Shanghai, Singapore, Tokyo, Zhengzhou

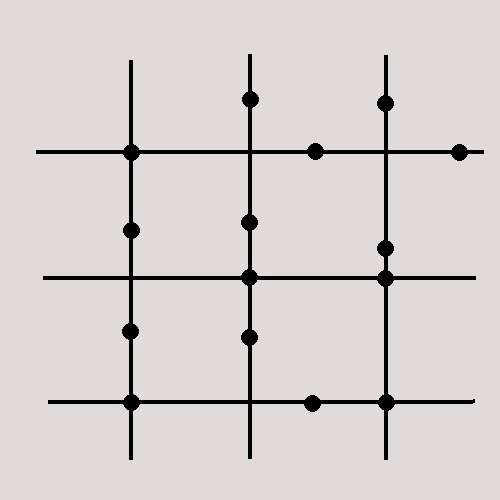
Complex grid, e.g. Barcelona, Berlin, Hangzhou, Hong Kong, Mexico City, Milan, Mumbai, Kolkata, Nanjing, New York, Osaka, Santiago, Shenzhen, Taipei, Tehran, Tianjin, Vienna, Wuhan

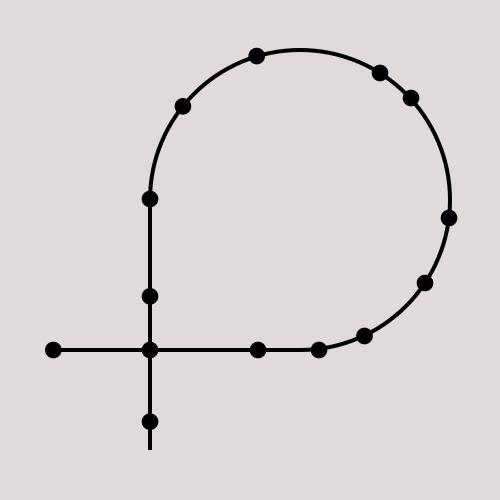
Extended loop, e.g. Changchun, Naples, Newcastle, Sofia

=== Passenger information ===
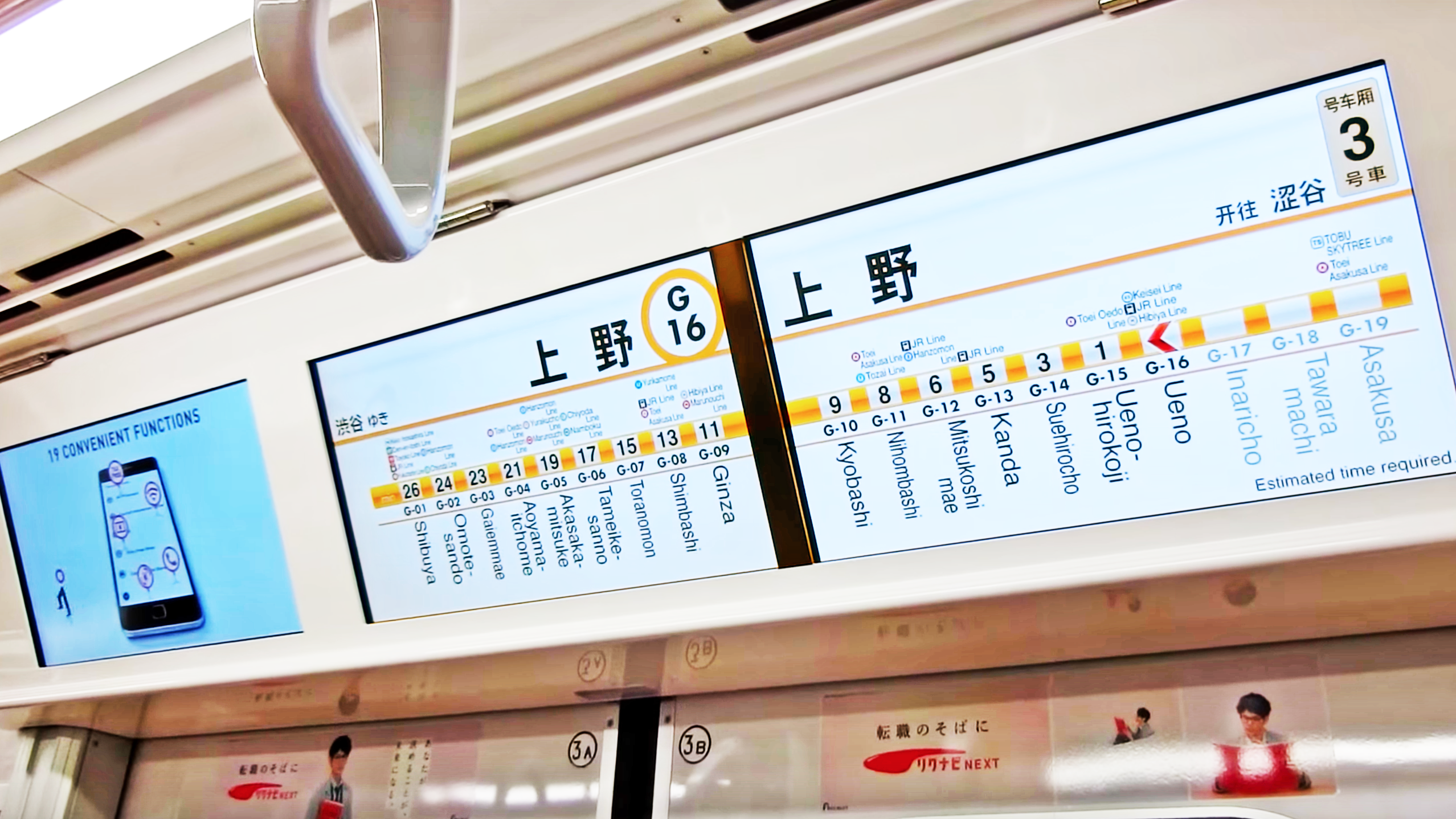
The Tokyo Metro uses LCD screens to show the current location, upcoming stops, and advertisements in several languages (Japanese, English, Simplified Chinese, Korean).

Rapid transit operators have often built up strong brands, often focused on easy recognition – to allow quick identification even in the vast array of signage found in large cities – combined with the desire to communicate speed, safety, and authority. In many cities, there is a single corporate image for the entire transit authority, but the rapid transit uses its own logo that fits into the profile.

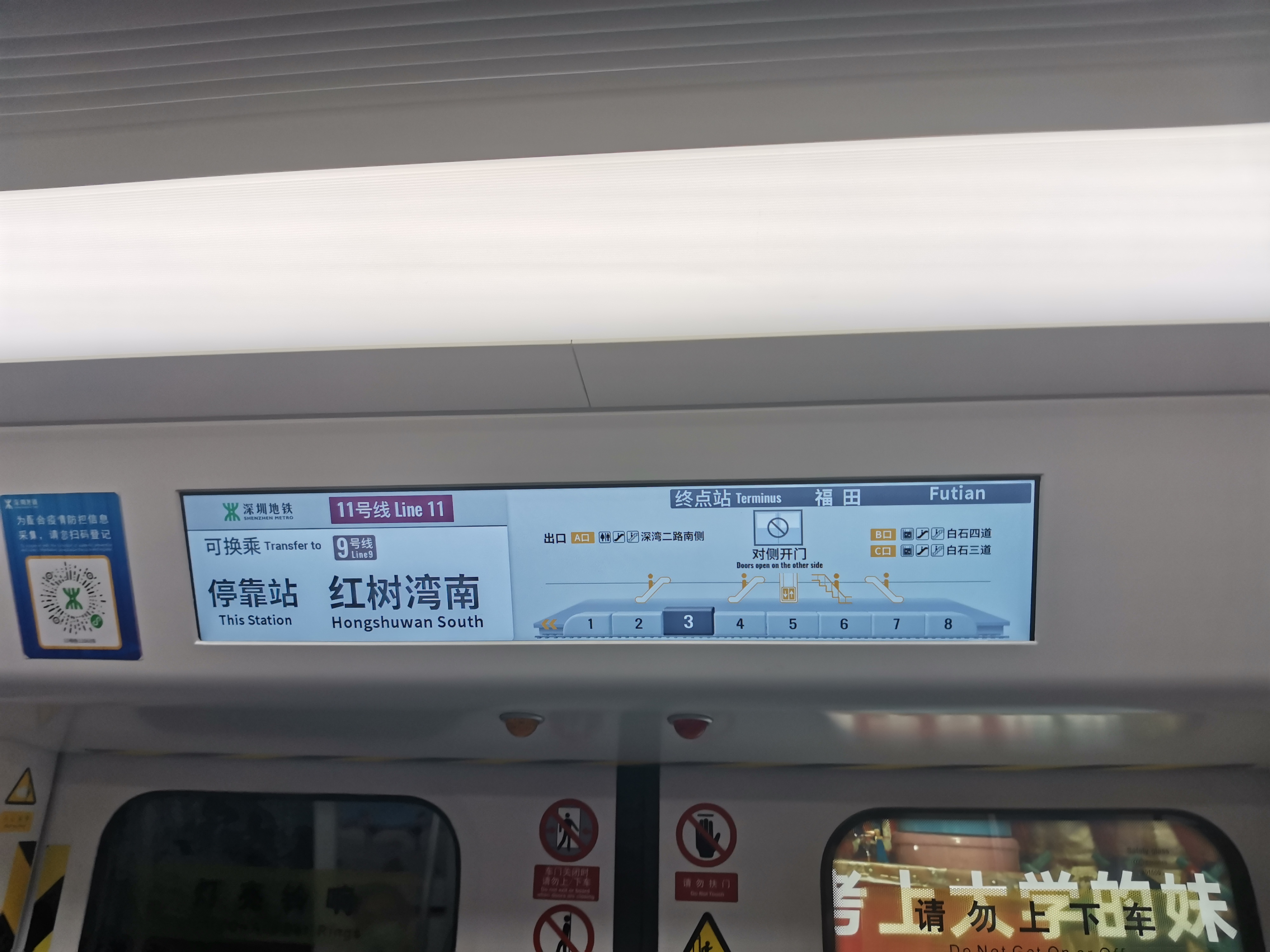
The Shenzhen Metro uses LCD screens to show the current location, upcoming stops and diagrams of the next station.

A transit map is a topological map or schematic diagram used to show the routes and stations in a public transport system. The main components are color-coded lines to indicate each line or service, with named icons to indicate stations. Maps may show only rapid transit or also include other modes of public transport. Transit maps can be found in transit vehicles, on platforms, elsewhere in stations, and in printed timetables. Maps help users understand the interconnections between different parts of the system; for example, they show the interchange stations where passengers can transfer between lines. Unlike conventional maps, transit maps are usually not geographically accurate, but emphasize the topological connections among the different stations. The graphic presentation may use straight lines and fixed angles, and often a fixed minimum distance between stations, to simplify the display of the transit network. Often this has the effect of compressing the distance between stations in the outer area of the system, and expanding distances between those close to the center.

Some systems assign unique alphanumeric codes to each of their stations to help commuters identify them, which briefly encodes information about the line it is on, and its position on the line. For example, on the Singapore MRT, Changi Airport MRT station has the alphanumeric code CG2, indicating its position as the 2nd station on the Changi Airport branch of the East West Line. Interchange stations have at least two codes, for example, Raffles Place MRT station has two codes, NS26 and EW14, the 26th station on the North South Line and the 14th station on the East West Line.

The Seoul Metro is another example that utilizes a code for its stations. Unlike that of Singapore's MRT, it is mostly numbers. Based on the line number, for example Sinyongsan station, is coded as station 429. Being on Line 4, the first number of the station code is 4. The last two numbers are the station number on that line. Interchange stations can have multiple codes. Like City Hall station in Seoul which is served by Line 1 and Line 2. It has a code of 132 and 201 respectively. The Line 2 is a circle line and the first stop is City Hall, therefore, City Hall has the station code of 201. For lines without a number like Bundang line it will have an alphanumeric code. Lines without a number that are operated by KORAIL will start with the letter 'K'.

With widespread use of the Internet and cell phones globally, transit operators now use these technologies to present information to their users. In addition to online maps and timetables, some transit operators now offer real-time information which allows passengers to know when the next vehicle will arrive, and expected travel times. The standardized GTFS data format for transit information allows many third-party software developers to produce web and smartphone app programs which give passengers customized updates regarding specific transit lines and stations of interest.

Mexico City Metro uses a unique pictogram for each station. Originally intended to help make the network map "readable" by illiterate people, this system has since become an "icon" of the system.

=== Safety and security ===
Compared to other modes of transport, rapid transit has a good safety record, with few accidents. Rail transport is subject to strict safety regulations, with requirements for procedure and maintenance to minimize risk. Head-on collisions are rare due to use of double track, and low operating speeds reduce the occurrence and severity of rear-end collisions and derailments. Fire is more of a danger underground, such as the King's Cross fire in London in November 1987, which killed 31 people. Systems are generally built to allow evacuation of trains at many places throughout the system.

High platforms, usually over 1 m (3 ft), are a safety risk, as people falling onto the tracks have trouble climbing back. Platform screen doors are used on some systems to eliminate this danger.

Rapid transit facilities are public spaces and may suffer from security problems: petty crimes, such as pickpocketing and baggage theft, and more serious violent crimes, as well as sexual assaults on tightly packed trains and platforms. Security measures include video surveillance, security guards, and conductors. In some countries a specialized transit police may be established. These security measures are normally integrated with measures to protect revenue by checking that passengers are not travelling without paying.

Some subway systems, such as the Beijing Subway, which is ranked by Worldwide Rapid Transit Data as the "World's Safest Rapid Transit Network" in 2015, incorporates airport-style security checkpoints at every station. Rapid transit systems have been subject to terrorism with many casualties, such as the 1995 Tokyo subway sarin gas attack and the 2005 "7/7" terrorist bombings on the London Underground.

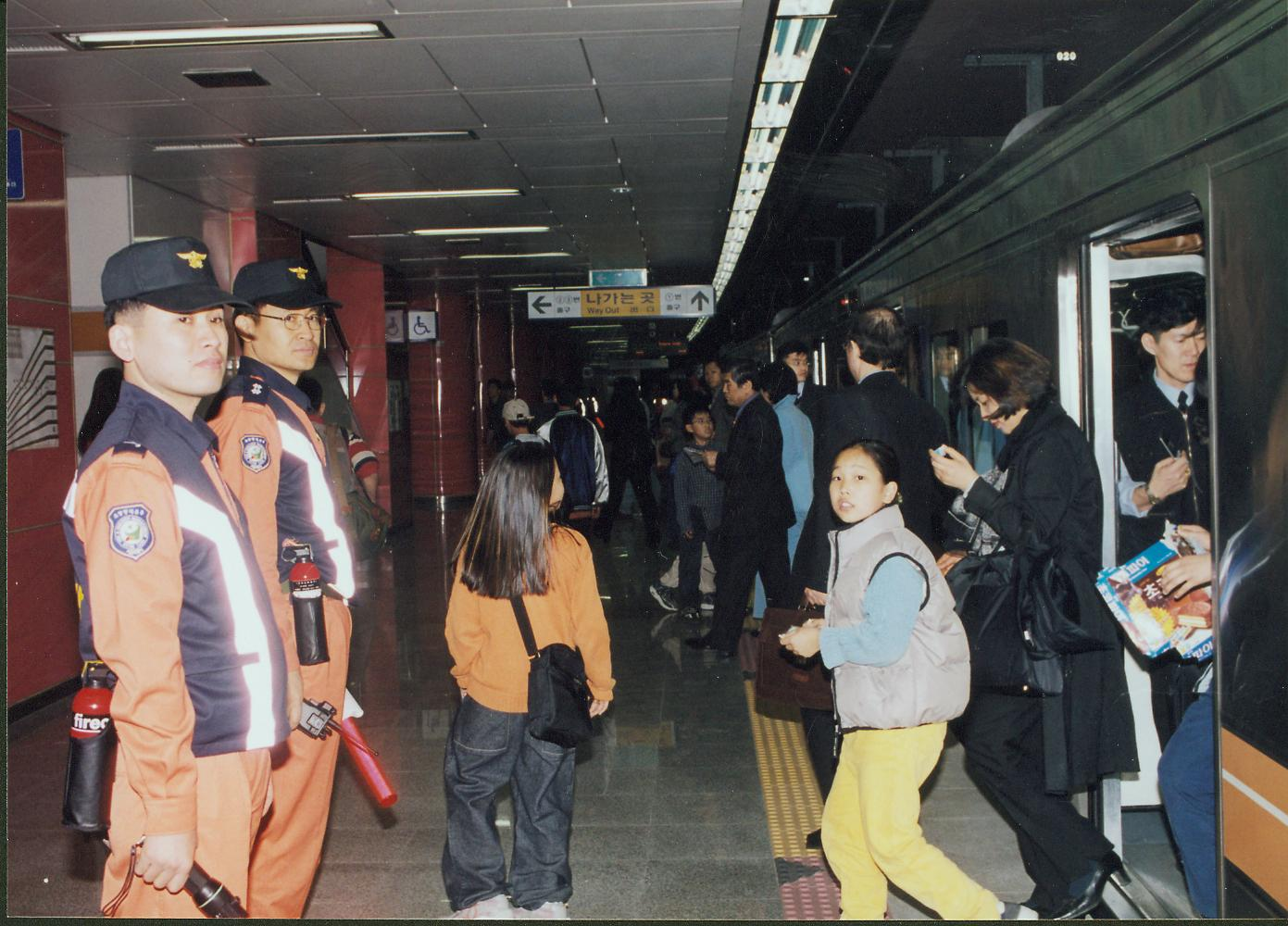
Seoul Fire Services personnel participating in a firefighting exercise on Seoul Subway Line 6 in March 2001

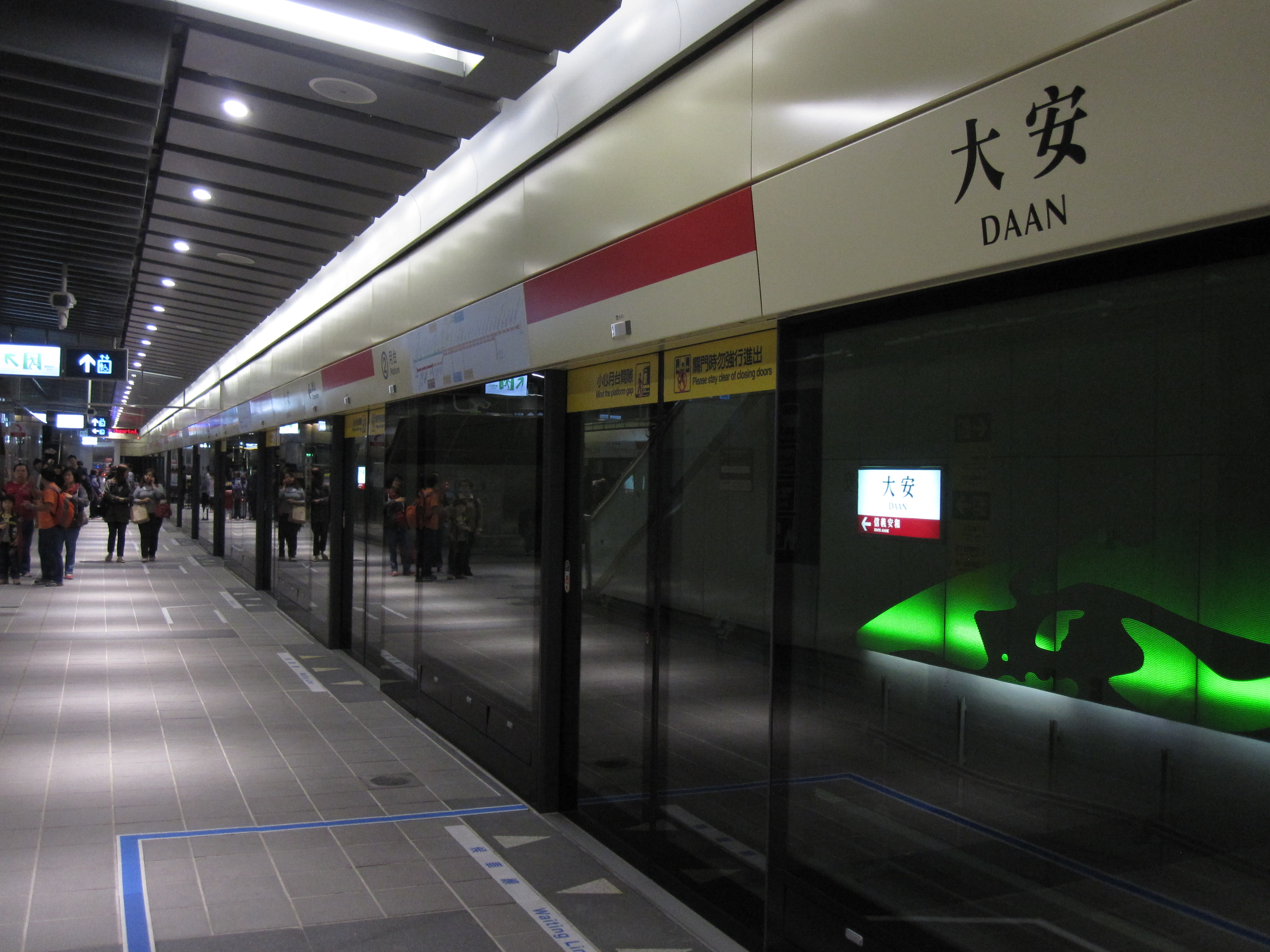
Platform-edge doors are used for safety at Daan Station on the Red Line (Tamsui-Xinyi Line), Taipei Metro, Taiwan.

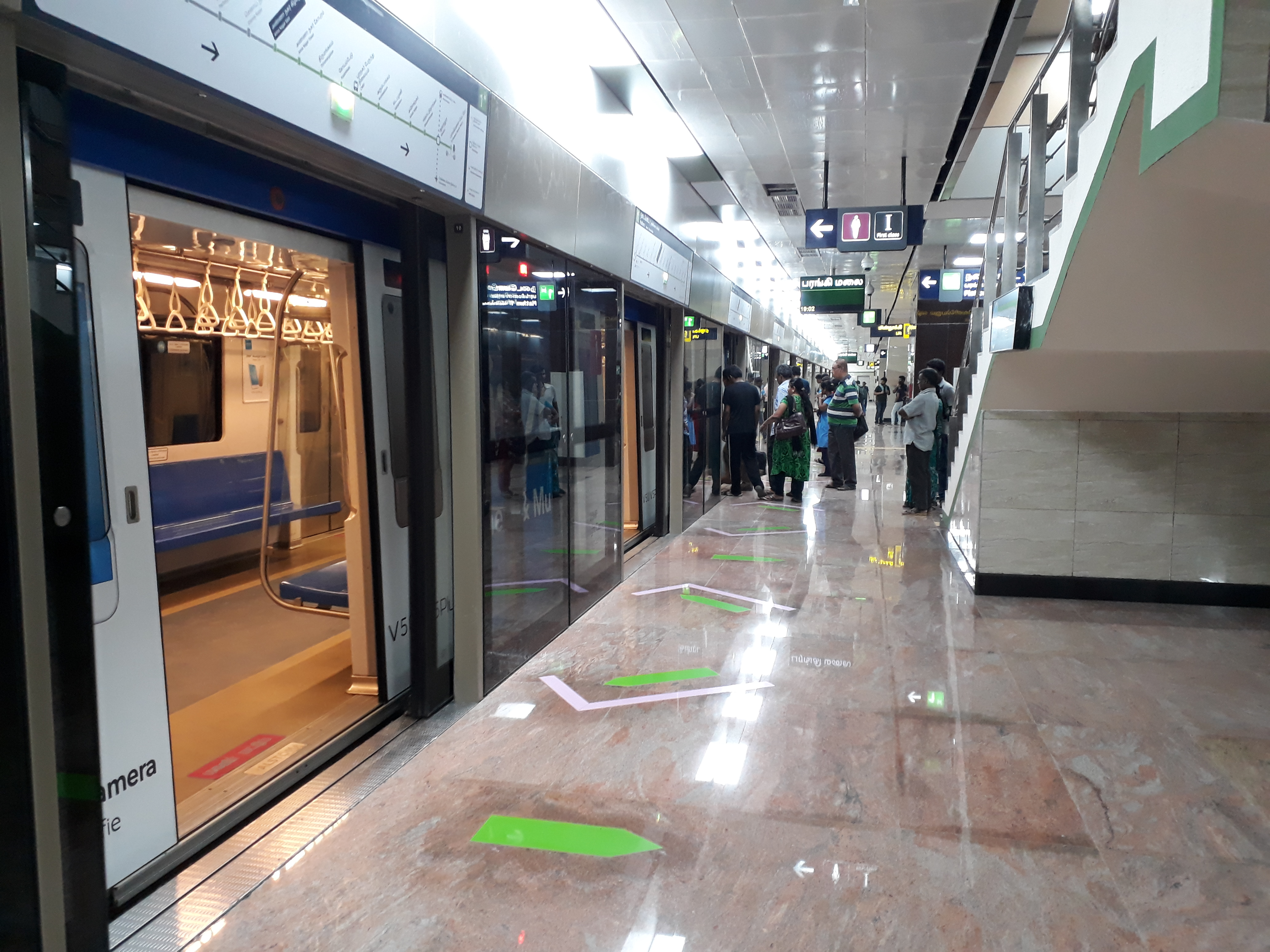
Full-height enclosed platform screen doors installed in an underground station of the Chennai Metro

=== Added features ===
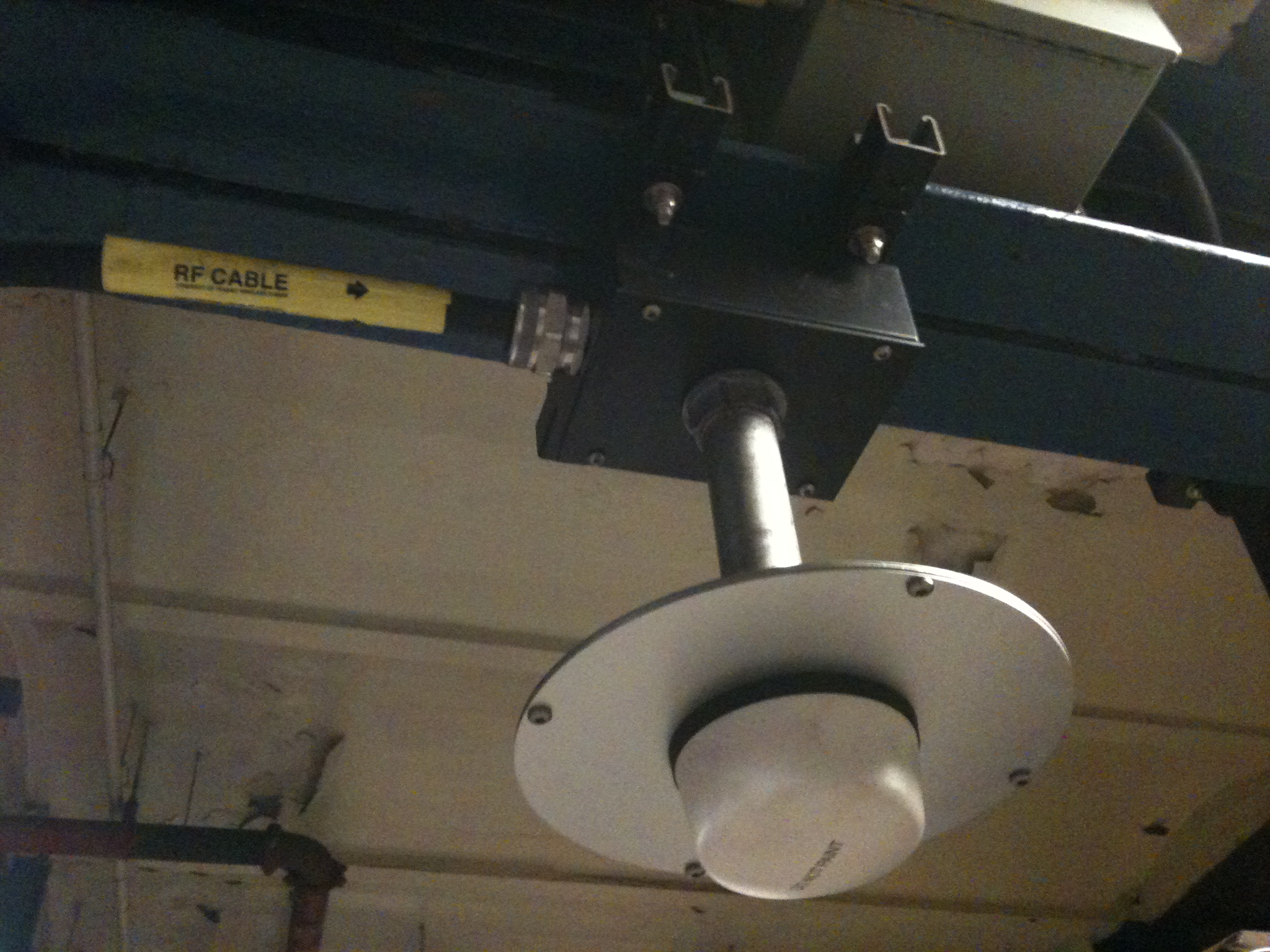
DAS antennas, such as this one installed by Transit Wireless in a NYC Subway station, are commonly used to provide cellular reception in metro stations.

Some rapid transit trains have extra features such as wall sockets, cellular reception, typically using a leaky feeder in tunnels and DAS antennas in stations, as well as Wi-Fi connectivity. The first metro system in the world to enable full mobile phone reception in underground stations and tunnels was Singapore's Mass Rapid Transit (MRT) system, which launched its first underground mobile phone network using AMPS in 1989. Many metro systems, such as the Hong Kong Mass Transit Railway (MTR) and the Berlin U-Bahn, provide mobile data connections in their tunnels for various network operators.

== Infrastructure ==
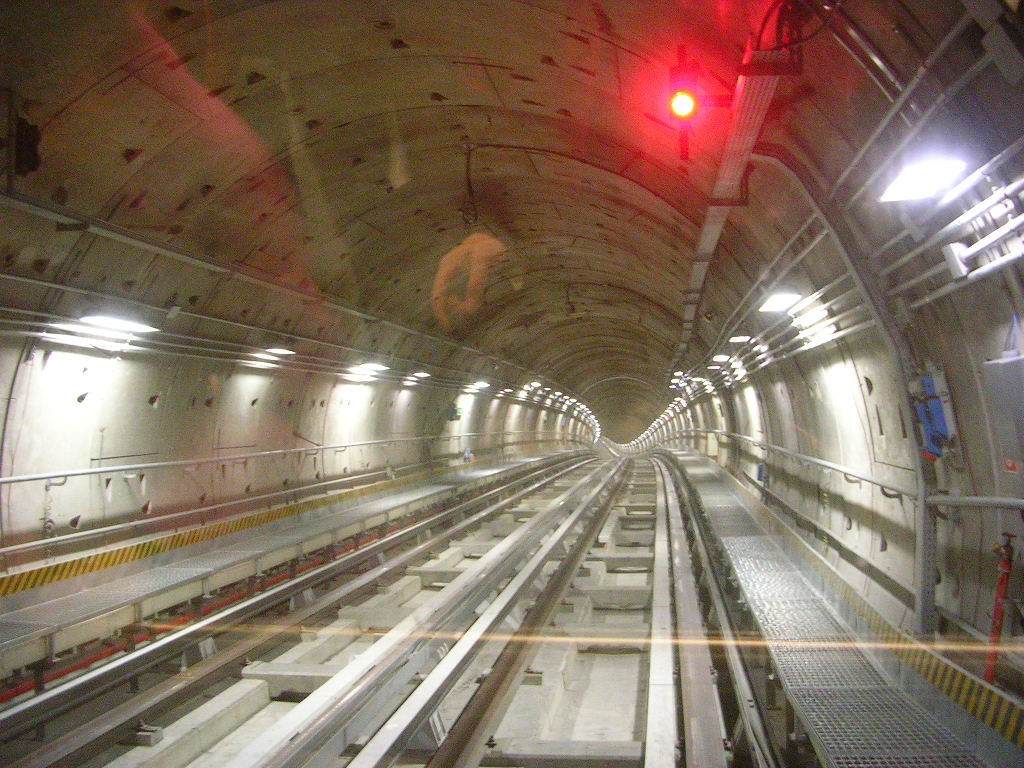
Inside a tunnel on the Turin Metro, the interlocking tunnel lining segments placed by a tunnel boring machine can be clearly seen.

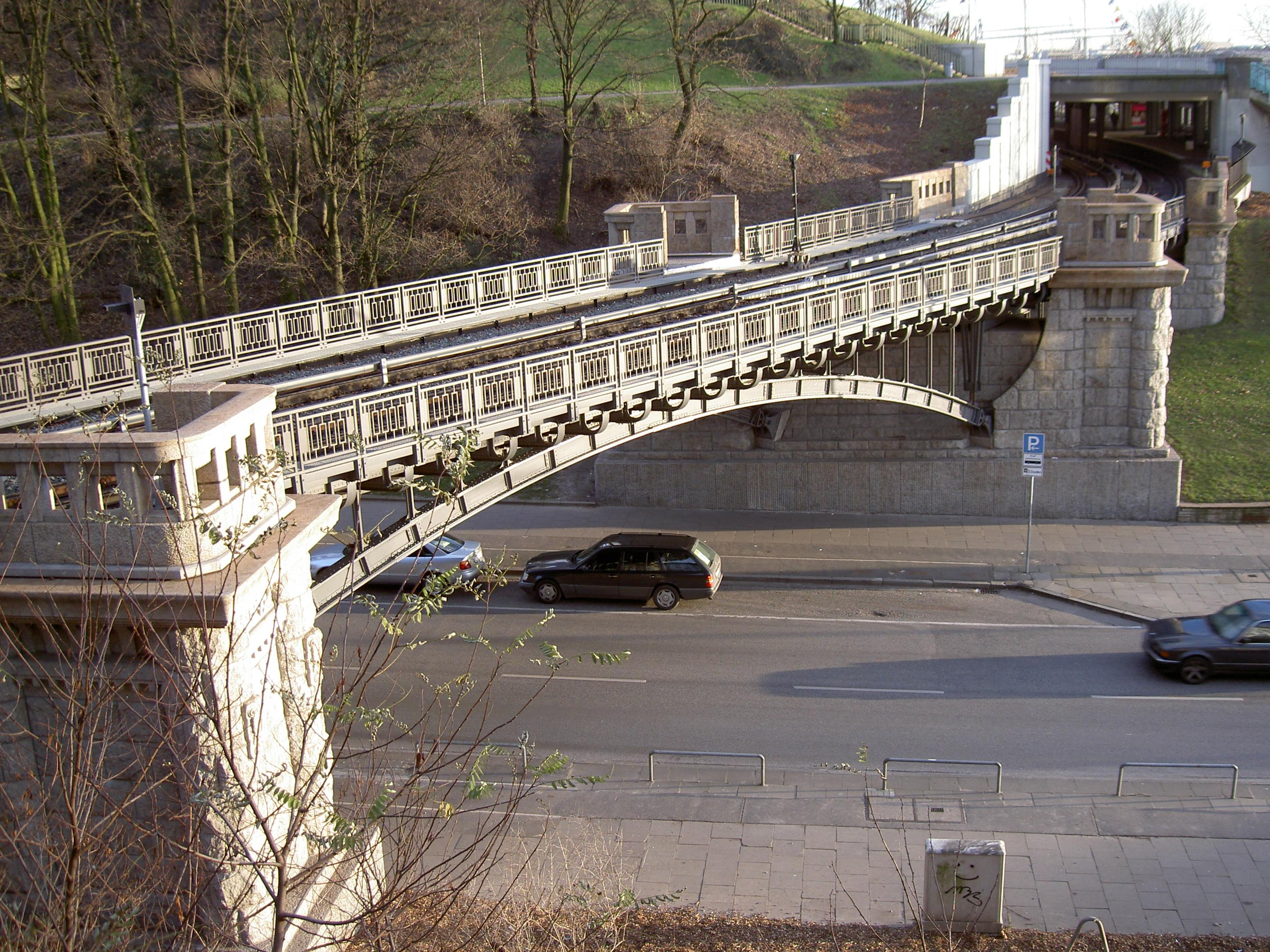
Landungsbrücken station in Hamburg is an example where the U-Bahn is on the surface while the S-Bahn station is on a lower level.

The technology used for public, mass rapid transit has undergone significant changes in the years since the Metropolitan Railway opened publicly in London in 1863.

High capacity monorails with larger and longer trains can be classified as rapid transit systems. Such monorail systems recently started operating in Chongqing and São Paulo. Light metro is a subclass of rapid transit that has the speed and grade separation of a "full metro" but is designed for smaller passenger numbers. It often has smaller loading gauges, has lighter and smaller train cars, and typically consists of two to four cars. Light metros are typically used as feeder lines into the main rapid transit system. For instance, the Wenhu Line of the Taipei Metro serves many relatively sparse neighbourhoods and feeds into and complements the high capacity metro lines.

Some systems have been built from scratch, others are reclaimed from former commuter rail or suburban tramway systems that have been upgraded, and often supplemented with an underground or elevated downtown section. Ground-level alignments with a dedicated right-of-way are typically used only outside dense areas, since they create a physical barrier in the urban fabric that hinders the flow of people and vehicles across their path and have a larger physical footprint. This method of construction is the cheapest as long as land values are low. It is often used for new systems in areas that are planned to fill up with buildings after the line is built.

=== Trains ===
Most rapid transit trains are electric multiple units with lengths from three to over ten cars. Crew sizes have decreased throughout history, with some modern systems now running completely unstaffed trains. Other trains continue to have drivers, even if their only role in normal operation is to open and close the doors of the trains at stations. Power is commonly delivered by a third rail or by overhead wires. The whole London Underground network uses fourth rail and others use the linear motor for propulsion.

Some urban rail lines are built to a loading gauge as large as that of main-line railways; others are built to a smaller one and have tunnels that restrict the size and sometimes the shape of the train compartments. One example is most of the London Underground, which has acquired the informal term "tube train" due to the cylindrical shape of the trains used on the deep tube lines.

Historically, rapid transit trains used ceiling fans and openable windows to provide fresh air and piston-effect wind cooling to riders. From the 1950s to the 1990s (and in most of Europe until the 2000s), many rapid transit trains from that era were also fitted with forced-air ventilation systems in carriage ceiling units for passenger comfort. Early rapid transit rolling stock fitted with air conditioning, such as the Hudson and Manhattan Railroad K-series cars from 1958, the New York City Subway R38 and R42 cars from the late-1960s, and the Nagoya Municipal Subway 3000 series, Osaka Municipal Subway 10 series and MTR M-Train EMUs from the 1970s, were generally only made possible largely due to the relatively generous loading gauges of these systems and also adequate open-air sections to dissipate hot air from these air conditioning units. Especially in some rapid transit systems such as the Montreal Metro (opened 1966) and Sapporo Municipal Subway (opened 1971), their entirely enclosed nature due to their use of rubber-tyred technology to cope with heavy snowfall experienced by both cities in winter precludes any air-conditioning retrofits of rolling stock due to the risk of heating the tunnels to temperatures that would be too hot for passengers and for train operations.

In many cities, metro networks consist of lines operating different sizes and types of vehicles. Although these sub-networks may not often be connected by track, in cases when it is necessary, rolling stock with a smaller loading gauge from one sub network may be transported along other lines that use larger trains. On some networks such operations are part of normal services.

=== Tracks ===
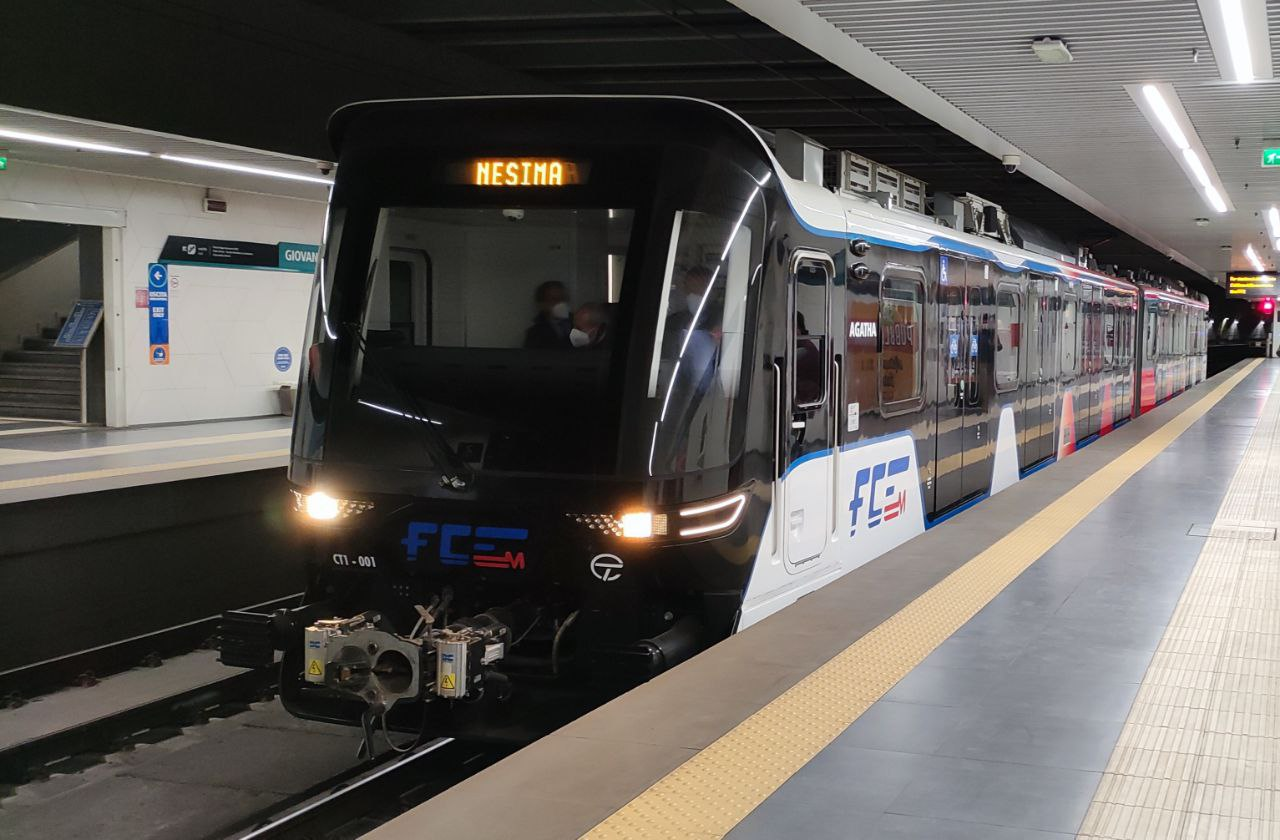
Catania Metro train at Giovanni XXIII Station

Most rapid transit systems use conventional standard gauge railway track. Since tracks in subway tunnels are not exposed to rain, snow, or other forms of precipitation, they are often fixed directly to the floor rather than resting on ballast, such as normal railway tracks.

An alternate technology, using rubber tires on narrow concrete or steel roll ways, was pioneered on certain lines of the Paris Métro and Mexico City Metro, and the first completely new system to use it was in Montreal, Canada. On most of these networks, additional horizontal wheels are required for guidance, and a conventional track is often provided in case of flat tires and for switching. There are also some rubber-tired systems that use a central guide rail, such as the Sapporo Municipal Subway and the NeoVal system in Rennes, France. Advocates of this system note that it is much quieter than conventional steel-wheeled trains, and allows for greater inclines given the increased traction of the rubber tires. However, they have higher maintenance costs and are less energy efficient. They also lose traction when weather conditions are wet or icy, preventing above-ground use of the Montréal Metro and limiting it on the Sapporo Municipal Subway, but not rubber-tired systems in other cities.

Some cities with steep hills incorporate mountain railway technologies in their metros. One of the lines of the Lyon Metro includes a section of rack (cog) railway, while the Carmelit, in Haifa, is an underground funicular.

For elevated lines, another alternative is the monorail, which can be built either as straddle-beam monorails or as a suspended monorail. While monorails have never gained wide acceptance outside Japan, there are some such as Chongqing Rail Transit's monorail lines which are widely used in a rapid transit setting.

=== Motive power ===
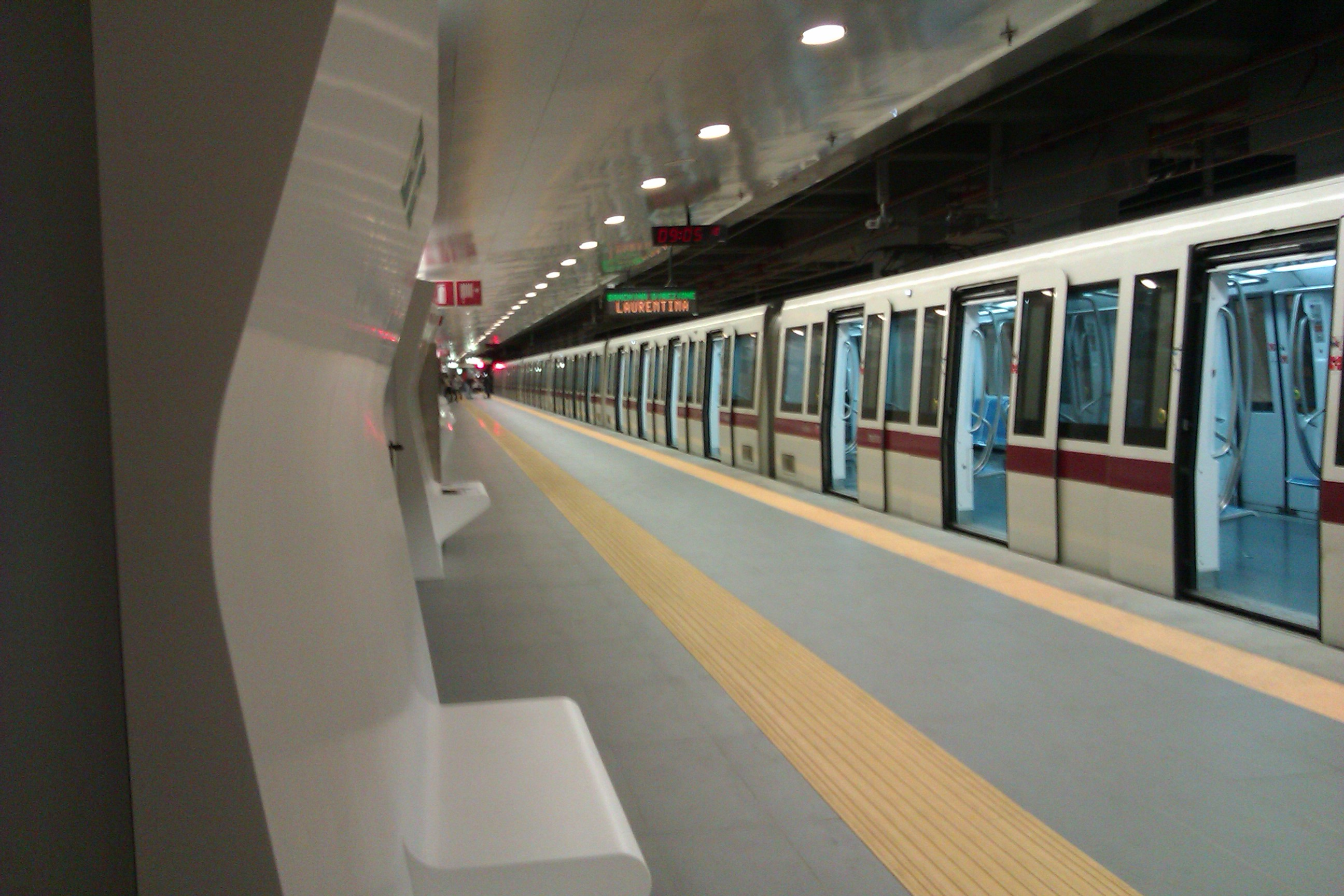
Rome Metro

Although trains on very early rapid transit systems like the Metropolitan Railway were powered using steam engines, either via cable haulage or steam locomotives, nowadays virtually all metro trains use electric power and are built to run as multiple units. Power for the trains, referred to as traction power, is usually supplied via one of two forms: an overhead line, suspended from poles or towers along the track or from structure or tunnel ceilings, or a third rail mounted at track level and contacted by a sliding "pickup shoe". The practice of sending power through rails on the ground is mainly due to the limited overhead clearance of tunnels, which physically prevents the use of overhead wires.

The use of overhead wires allows higher power supply voltages to be used. Overhead wires are more likely to be used on metro systems without many tunnels, for example, the Shanghai Metro. Overhead wires are employed on some systems that are predominantly underground, as in Barcelona, Fukuoka, Hong Kong, Madrid, and Shijiazhuang. Both overhead wire and third-rail systems usually use the running rails as the return conductor. Some systems use a separate fourth rail for this purpose. There are transit lines that make use of both rail and overhead power, with vehicles able to switch between the two such as Blue Line in Boston.

Most rapid transit systems use direct current but some systems in India, mainly Delhi Metro, use 25 kV 50 Hz supplied by overhead wires.

=== Tunnels ===
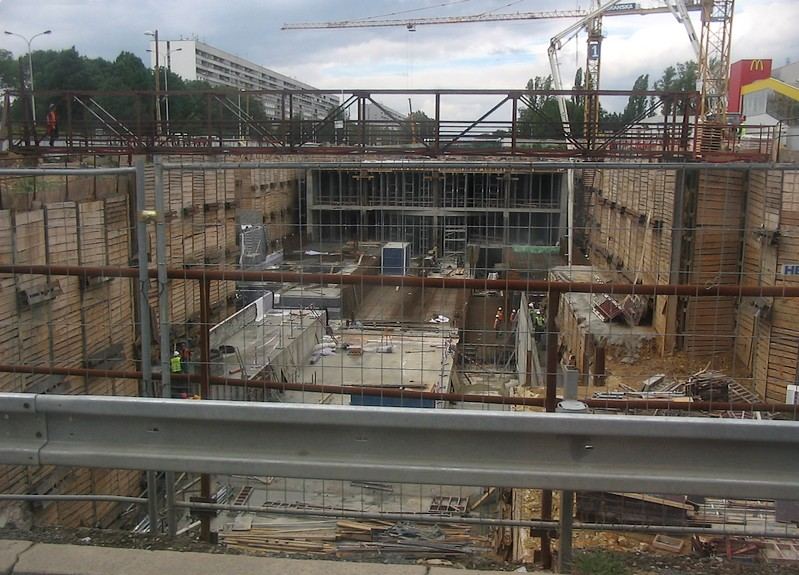
Constructing a subway station Prosek in Prague

At subterranean levels, tunnels move traffic away from street level, avoiding delays caused by traffic congestion and leaving more land available for buildings and other uses. In areas of high land prices and dense land use, tunnels may be the only economic route for mass transportation. Cut-and-cover tunnels are constructed by digging up city streets, which are then rebuilt over the tunnel. Alternatively, tunnel-boring machines can be used to dig deep-bore tunnels that lie further down in bedrock.

The construction of an underground metro is an expensive project and is often carried out over a number of years. There are several different methods of building underground lines.

In one common method, known as cut-and-cover the city streets are excavated and a tunnel structure strong enough to support the road above is built in the trench, which is then filled in and the roadway rebuilt. This method often involves extensive relocation of utilities commonly buried not far below street level – particularly power and telephone wiring, water and gas mains, and sewers. This relocation must be done carefully, as according to documentaries from the National Geographic Society, one of the causes of the April 1992 explosions in Guadalajara was a mislocated water pipeline. The structures are typically made of concrete, perhaps with structural columns of steel. In the oldest systems, brick, and cast iron were used. Cut-and-cover construction can take so long that it is often necessary to build a temporary roadbed while construction is going on underneath, in order to avoid closing main streets for long periods of time.

Another tunneling method is called bored tunneling. Here, construction starts with a vertical shaft from which tunnels are horizontally dug, often with a tunneling shield, thus avoiding almost any disturbance to existing streets, buildings, and utilities. But problems with ground water are more likely, and tunneling through native bedrock may require blasting. The first city to extensively use deep tunneling was London, where a thick sedimentary layer of clay largely avoids both problems. The confined space in the tunnel also limits the machinery that can be used, but specialized tunnel-boring machines are now available to overcome this challenge.

A disadvantage with this is that the cost of tunneling is much higher than building cut-and-cover systems, at-grade or elevated. Early tunneling machines could not make tunnels large enough for conventional railway equipment, necessitating special low, round trains, such as are still used by most of the London Underground. It cannot install air conditioning on most of its lines because the amount of empty space between the trains and tunnel walls is so small. Other lines were built with cut-and-cover and have since been equipped with air-conditioned trains.

The deepest metro system in the world was built in St. Petersburg, Russia where in the marshland, stable soil starts more than 50 m (160 ft) deep. Above that level, the soil mostly consists of water-bearing finely dispersed sand. Because of this, only three stations out of nearly 60 are built near ground level and three more above the ground. Some stations and tunnels lie as deep as 100–120 m (330–390 ft) below the surface. Usually, the vertical distance between the ground level and the rail is used to represent the depth. Among the possible candidates are:

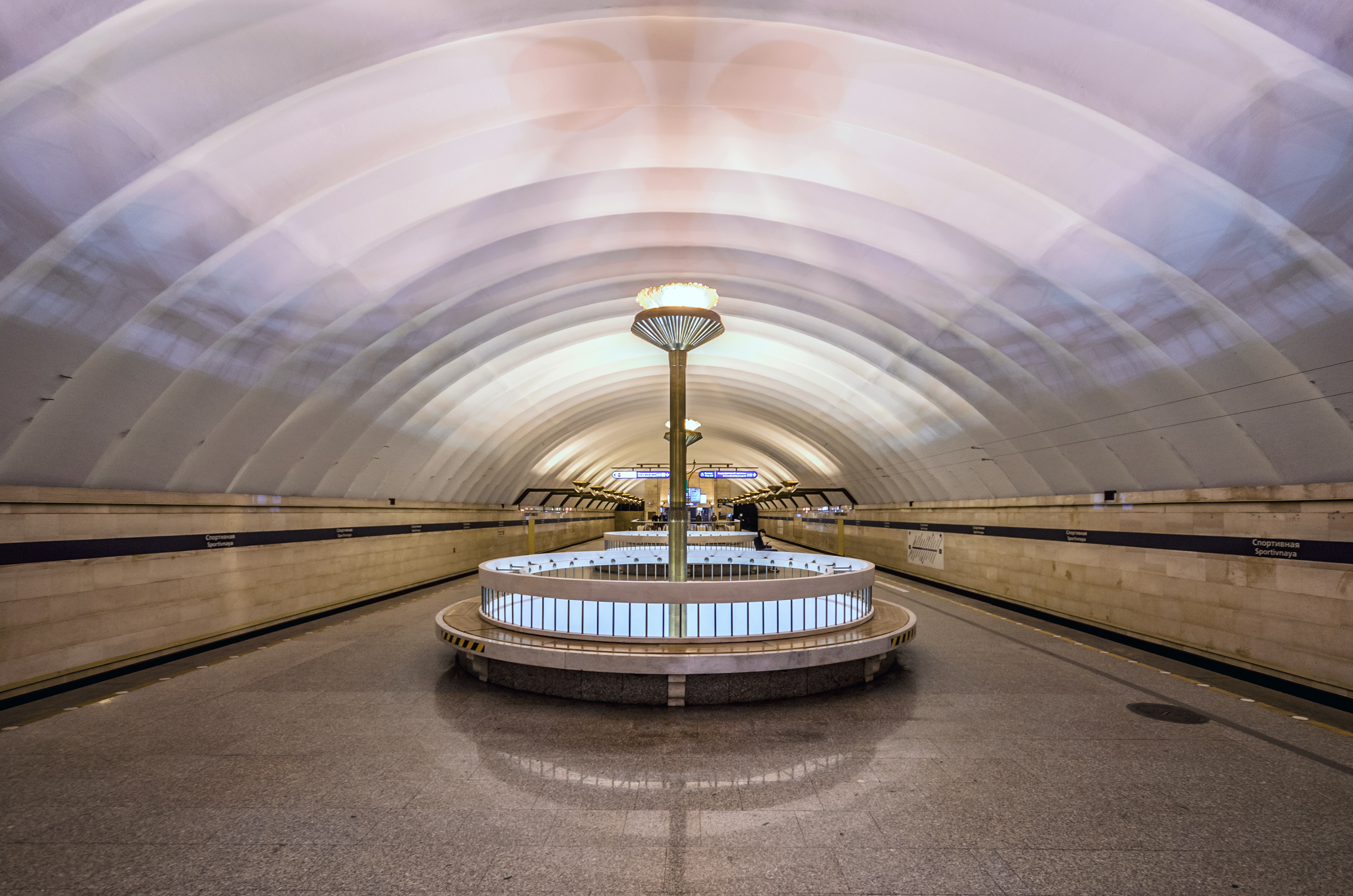
The Sportivnaya station of the Saint Petersburg Metro has two levels.

Deepest stations:

- Hongyancun station in Chongqing Metro, China (116 m (381 ft), opened in 2022)
- Arsenalna station in Kyiv Metro, Ukraine (105.5 m (346 ft), opened 1960, built under a hill)
- Sofia station in Stockholm Metro, Sweden (c. 100 m (c. 328 ft), opening in 2030)
- Hongtudi station in Chongqing Metro, China (94 m (308 ft), opened in 2016)
- Admiralteyskaya (The Admiralty) in Saint Petersburg Metro, Russia (86 m (282 ft), opened 2011)
- Liyuchi station in Chongqing Metro, China (76 m (249 ft), opened in 2017)
- Park Pobedy station in Moscow (c. 80 m (260 ft), opened 2005, built under a hill)
- Puhung station in Pyongyang Metro, North Korea (which doubles as a nuclear shelter)
- Washington Park MAX Light Rail station in Portland, Oregon, US (built under a hill), 80 m (260 ft)

An advantage of deep tunnels is that they can dip in a basin-like profile between stations, without incurring the significant extra costs associated with digging near ground level. This technique, also referred to as putting stations "on humps", allows gravity to assist the trains as they accelerate from one station and brake at the next. It was used as early as 1890 on parts of the City and South London Railway and has been used many times since, for example in Montreal and Nuremberg.

The West Island line, an extension of the MTR Island line serving western Hong Kong Island, opened in 2015, has two stations (Sai Ying Pun and HKU) situated over 100 m (330 ft) below ground level, to serve passengers on the Mid-Levels. They have several entrances/exits equipped with high-speed lifts, instead of escalators. These kinds of exits have existed in many London Underground stations and stations in former Soviet Union nations.

=== Elevated railways ===
Elevated railways are a cheaper and easier way to build an exclusive right-of-way without digging expensive tunnels or creating barriers. In addition to street level railways they may also be the only other feasible alternative due to considerations such as a high water table close to the city surface that raises the cost of, or even precludes underground railways (e.g. Miami). Elevated guideways were popular around the beginning of the 20th century, but fell out of favor. They came back into fashion in the last quarter of the century – often in combination with driverless systems, for instance Vancouver's SkyTrain, London's Docklands Light Railway, the Miami Metrorail, Bangkok Skytrain, and Skyline Honolulu.

=== Stations ===
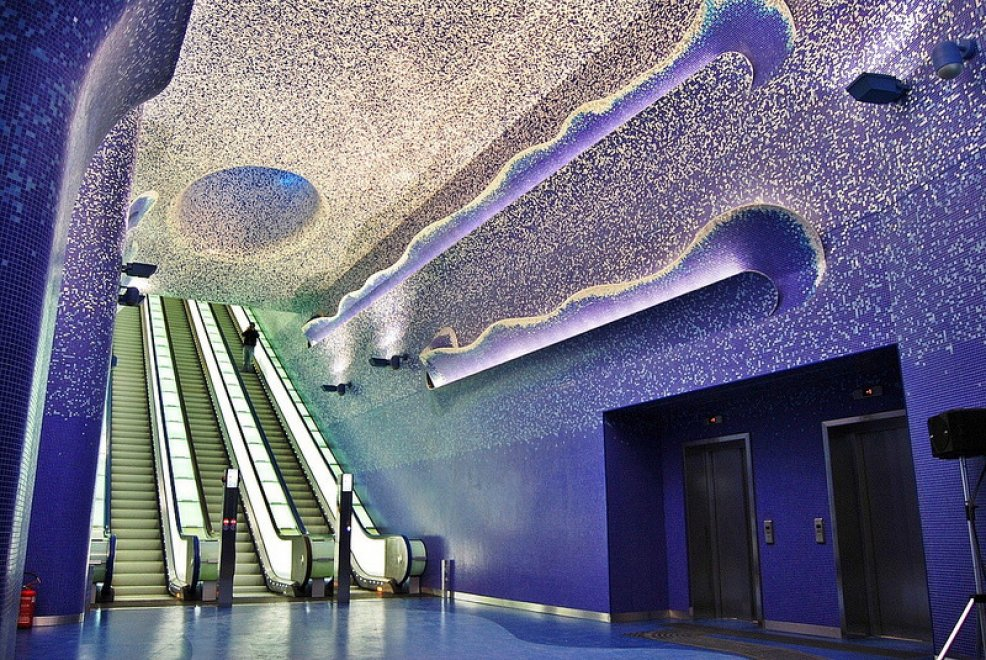
Toledo station on Line 1 of the Naples Metro. On 30 November 2012, the Toledo station was elected by The Daily Telegraph as the most beautiful subway station in Europe and the world, a recognition echoed by CNN's rankings.

Stations function as hubs to allow passengers to board and disembark from trains. They are also payment checkpoints and allow passengers to transfer between modes of transport, for instance to buses or other trains. Access is provided via either island- or side platforms. Underground stations, especially deep-level ones, increase the overall transport time: long escalator rides to the platforms mean that the stations can become bottlenecks if not adequately built. Some underground and elevated stations are integrated into vast underground or skyway networks respectively, that connect to nearby commercial buildings. In suburbs, there may be a "park and ride" connected to the station.

To allow easy access to the trains, the platform height allows step-free access between platform and train. If the station complies with accessibility standards, it allows both disabled people and those with wheeled baggage easy access to the trains, though if the track is curved there can be a gap between the train and platform. Some stations use platform screen doors to increase safety by preventing people falling onto the tracks, as well as reducing ventilation costs.

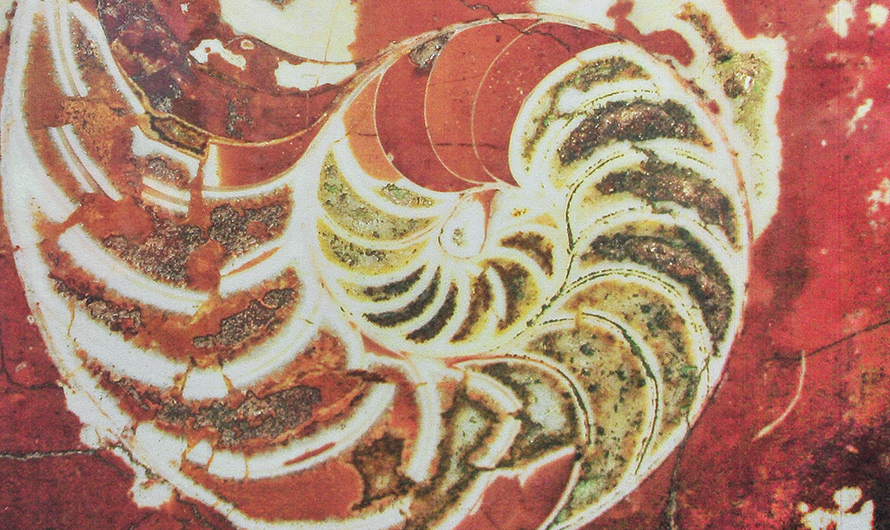
A giant nautilus in red marble on the wall on Moscow Metro

Particularly in the former Soviet Union and other Eastern European countries, but to an increasing extent elsewhere, the stations were built with splendid decorations such as marble walls, polished granite floors and mosaics—thus exposing the public to art in their everyday life, outside galleries and museums. Moscow Metro's wall cladding contains many fossils, from corals to ammonoids and nautiluses. The systems in Moscow, St. Petersburg, Tashkent and Kyiv are widely regarded as some of the most beautiful in the world. Several other cities such as London, Stockholm, Montreal, Lisbon, Bangalore, Naples and Los Angeles have also focused on art, which may range from decorative wall claddings, to large, flamboyant artistic schemes integrated with station architecture, to displays of ancient artifacts recovered during station construction. It may be possible to profit by attracting more passengers by spending relatively small amounts on grand architecture, art, cleanliness, accessibility, lighting and a feeling of safety.

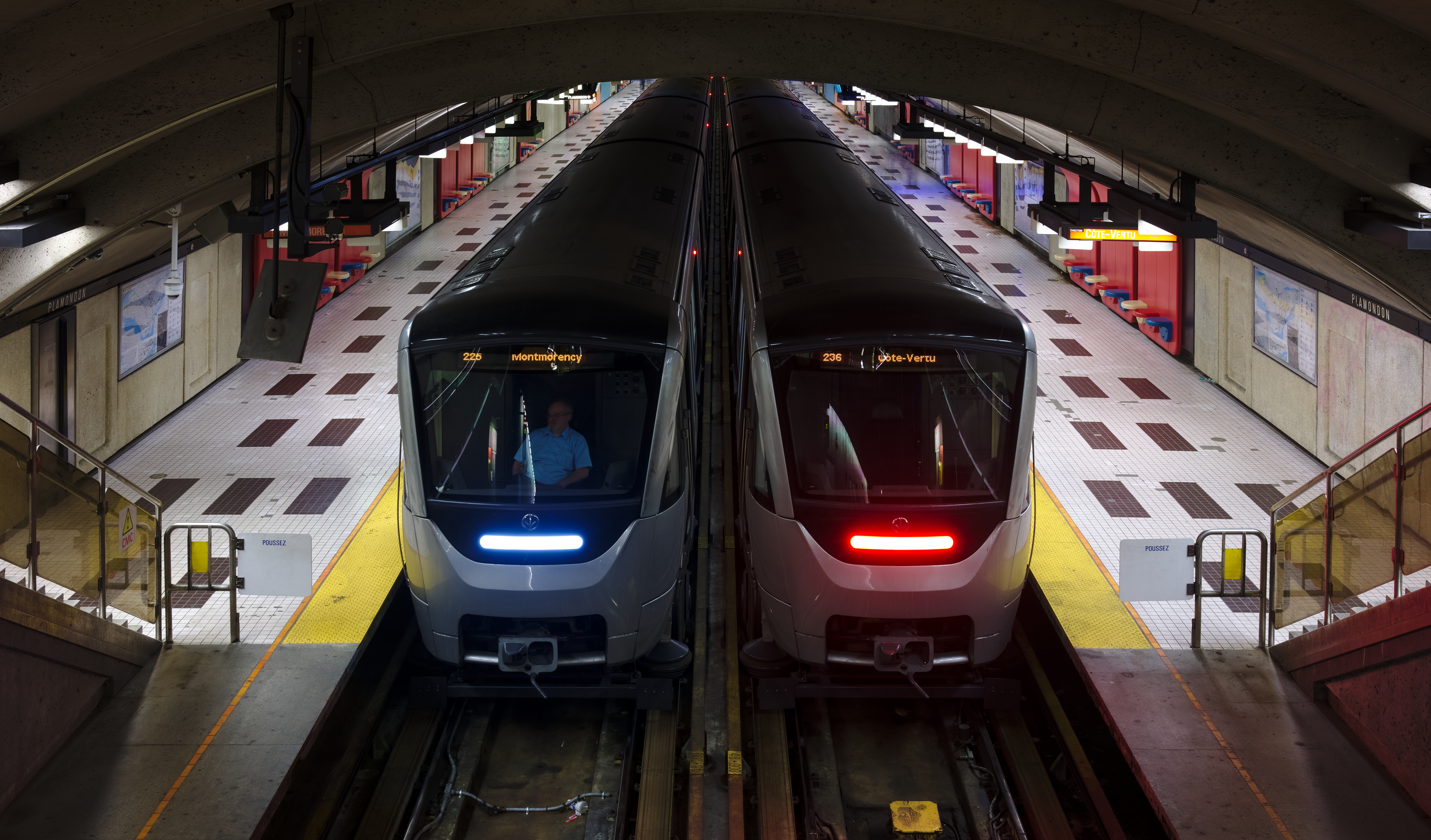
Two Montreal Metro trains stopped at a station.

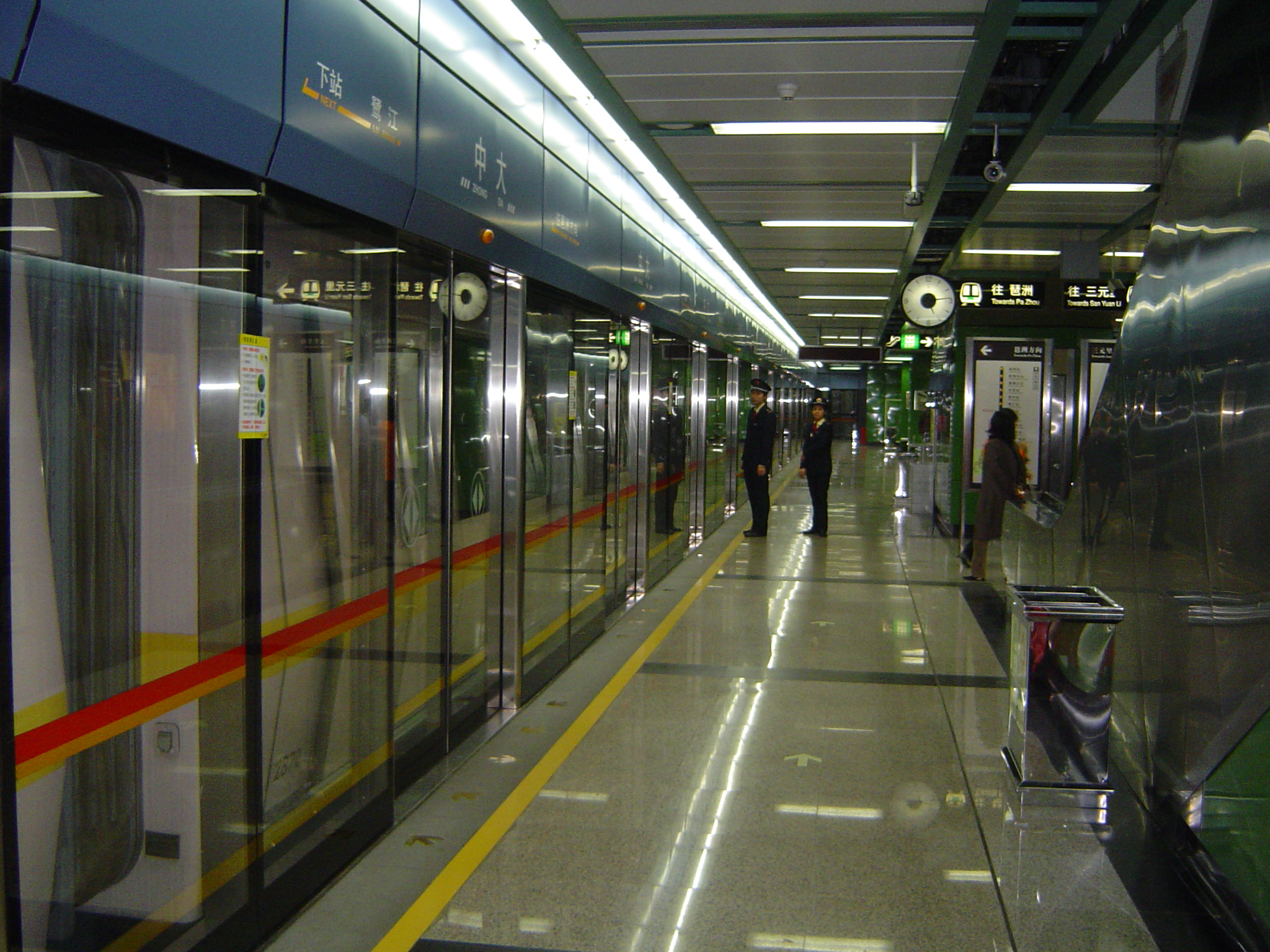
A station of the Guangzhou Metro in 2005

== Crew size and automation ==
In the early days of underground railways, at least two staff members were needed to operate each train: one or more attendants (also called "conductor" or "guard") to operate the doors or gates, as well as a driver (also called the "engineer" or "motorman"). The introduction of powered doors around 1920 permitted crew sizes to be reduced, and trains in many cities are now operated by a single person. Where the operator would not be able to see the whole side of the train to tell whether the doors can be safely closed, mirrors or closed-circuit TV monitors are often provided for that purpose.

A replacement system for human drivers became available in the 1960s, with the advancement of computerized technologies for automatic train control and, later, automatic train operation (ATO). ATO could start a train, accelerate to the correct speed, and stop automatically in the correct position at the railway platform at the next station, while taking into account the information that a human driver would obtain from lineside or cab signals. The first metro line to use this technology in its entirety was London's Victoria line, opened in 1968.

In normal operation, a crew member sits in the driver's position at the front, but is only responsible for closing the doors at each station. By pressing two "start" buttons the train would then move automatically to the next station. This style of "semi-automatic train operation" (STO), known technically as "Grade of Automation (GoA) 2", has become widespread, especially on newly built lines like the San Francisco Bay Area's BART network.

A variant of ATO, "driverless train operation" (DTO) or technically "GoA 3", is seen on some systems, as in London's Docklands Light Railway, which opened in 1987. Here, a "passenger service agent" (formerly called "train captain") would ride with the passengers rather than sit at the front as a driver would, but would have the same responsibilities as a driver in a GoA 2 system. This technology could allow trains to operate completely automatically with no crew, just as most elevators do. When the initially increasing costs for automation began to decrease, this became a financially attractive option for the operators.

At the same time, countervailing arguments stated that in an emergency situation, a crew member on board the train would have possibly been able to prevent the emergency in the first place, drive a partially failed train to the next station, assist with an evacuation if needed, or call for the correct emergency services and help direct them to the location where the emergency occurred. In some cities, the same reasons are used to justify a crew of two rather than one; one person drives from the front of the train, while the other operates the doors from a position farther back, and is more conveniently able to assist passengers in the rear cars. An example of the presence of a driver purely due to union opposition is the Scarborough RT line in Toronto.

Completely unstaffed trains, or "unattended train operation" (UTO) or technically "GoA 4", are more accepted on newer systems where there are no existing crews to be displaced, and especially on light metro lines. One of the first such systems was the VAL (véhicule automatique léger or "automated light vehicle"), first used in 1983 on the Lille Metro in France. Additional VAL lines have been built in other cities such as Toulouse, France, and Turin, Italy. Another system that uses unstaffed trains is Bombardier's Innovia Metro, originally developed by the Urban Transportation Development Corporation as the Intermediate Capacity Transit System (ICTS). It was later used on the SkyTrain in Vancouver and the Kelana Jaya Line in Kuala Lumpur, both of which carry no crew members.

Another obstacle to conversion of existing lines to fully automated operation is that the conversion may necessitate a shutdown of operations. Furthermore, where several lines share the same infrastructure, it may be necessary to share tracks between automated and human-operated trains at least for a transitory period. The Nuremberg U-Bahn converted the existing U2 to fully automated (GoA4) in early 2010 without a single day of service disruption. Before that it had run in mixed operation with the newly opened fully driverless U3 from 2008. Nuremberg U-Bahn was the first system in the world to undertake such a transition with mixed operation and without service disruption. While this demonstrates that those technological hurdles can be overcome, the project was severely delayed, missing the target of being in operation in time for the 2006 FIFA World Cup and the hoped for international orders for the system of automation employed in Nuremberg never materialized.

Systems that use automatic trains also commonly employ full-height platform screen doors or half-height automatic platform gates in order to improve safety and ensure passenger confidence, but this is not universal, as networks like Nuremberg do not, using infrared sensors instead to detect obstacles on the track. Conversely, some lines which retain drivers or manual train operation nevertheless use PSDs, notably London's Jubilee Line Extension. The first network to install PSDs on an already operational system was Hong Kong's MTR, followed by the Singapore MRT.

As for larger trains, the Paris Métro has human drivers on most lines but runs automated trains on its newest line, Line 14, which opened in 1998. The older Line 1 was subsequently converted to unattended operation by 2012, and Line 4 in 2023. The North East MRT line in Singapore, which opened in 2003, is the world's first fully automated underground urban heavy-rail line. The MTR Disneyland Resort line is also automated, along with trains on the South Island line.

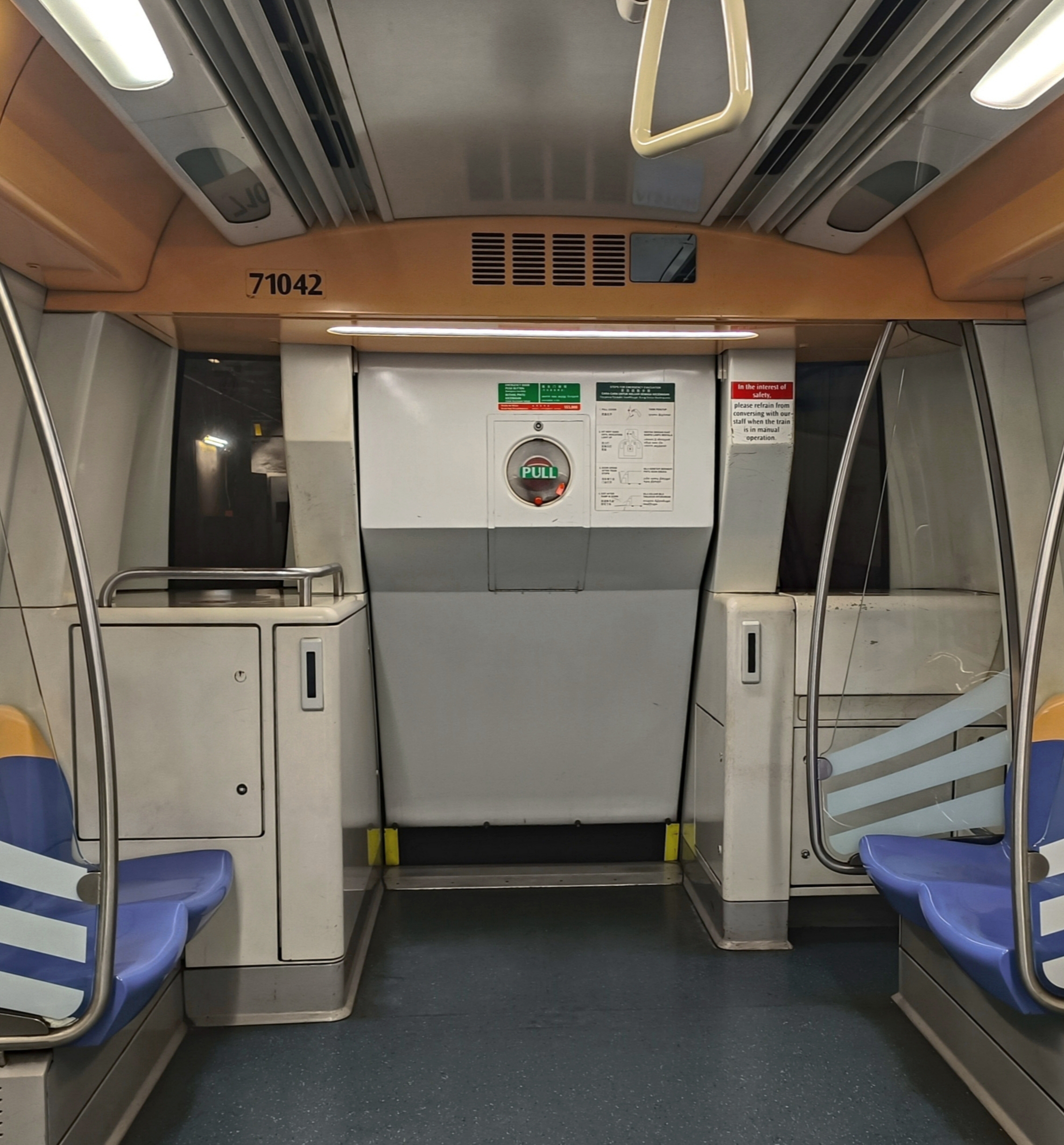
Trains on the North East MRT line in Singapore are fully automated and are not operated by any driver.

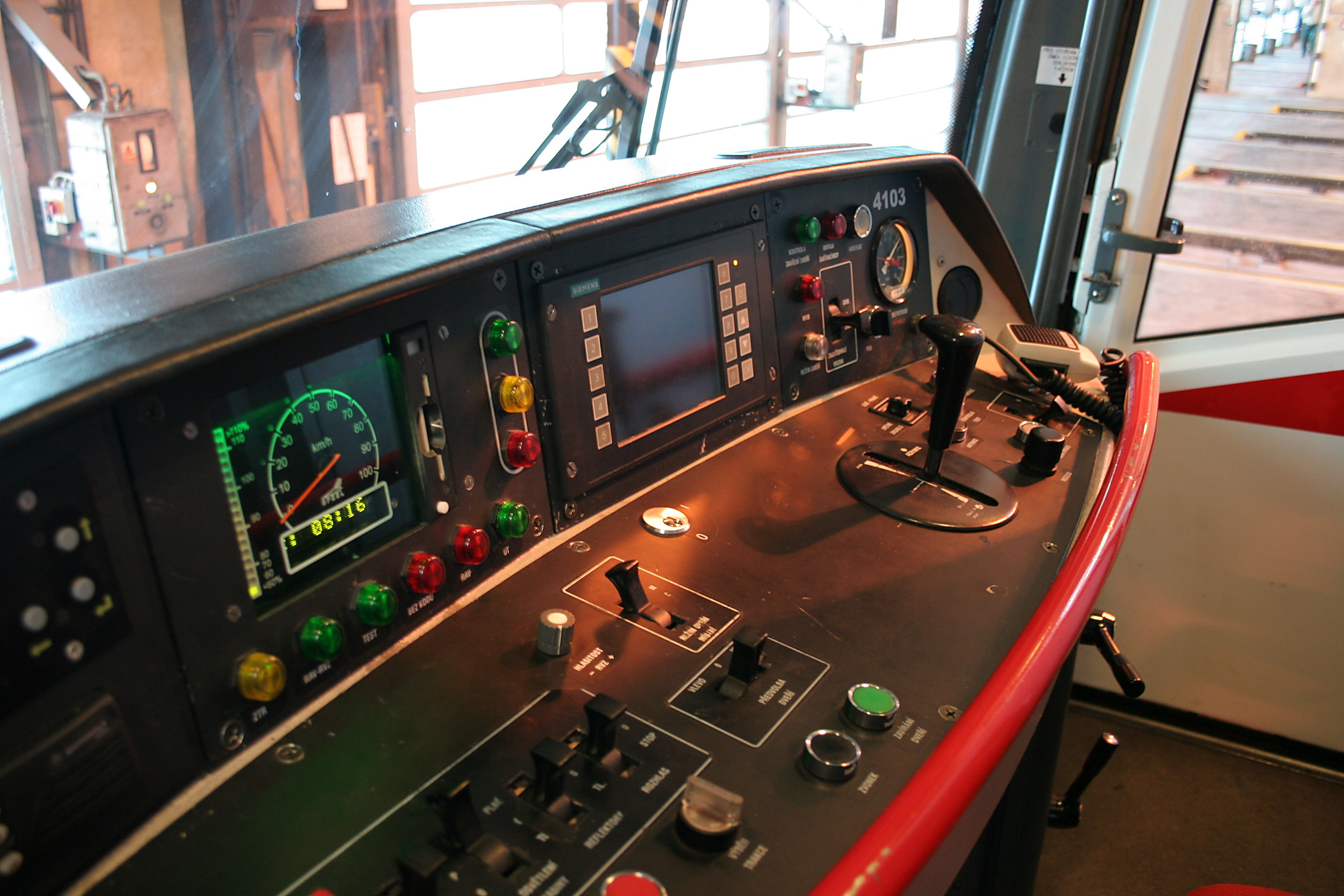
Prague Metro, M1 driver panel

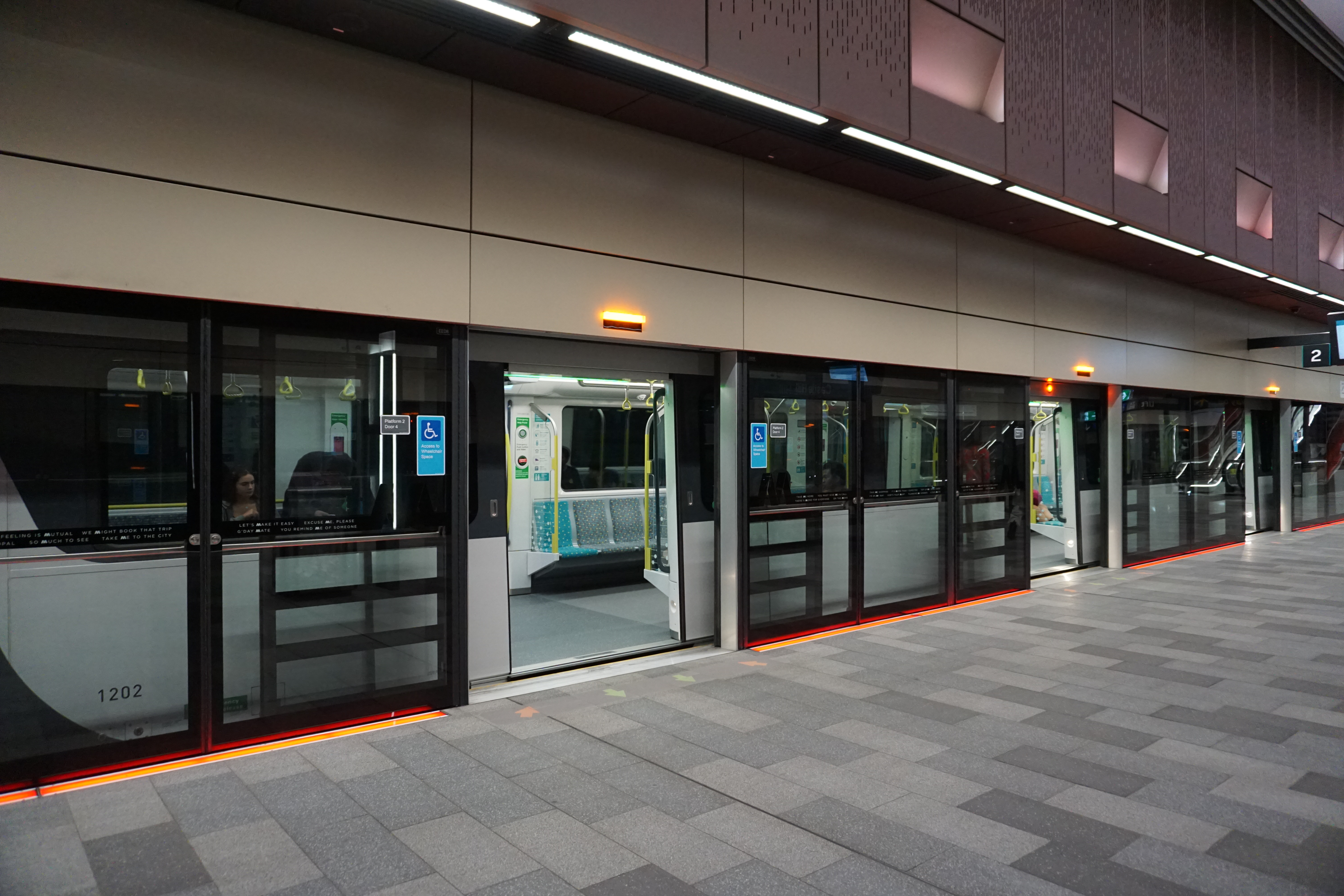
Platform screen doors at Castle Hill Station on the Sydney Metro

== Modal tradeoffs and interconnections ==
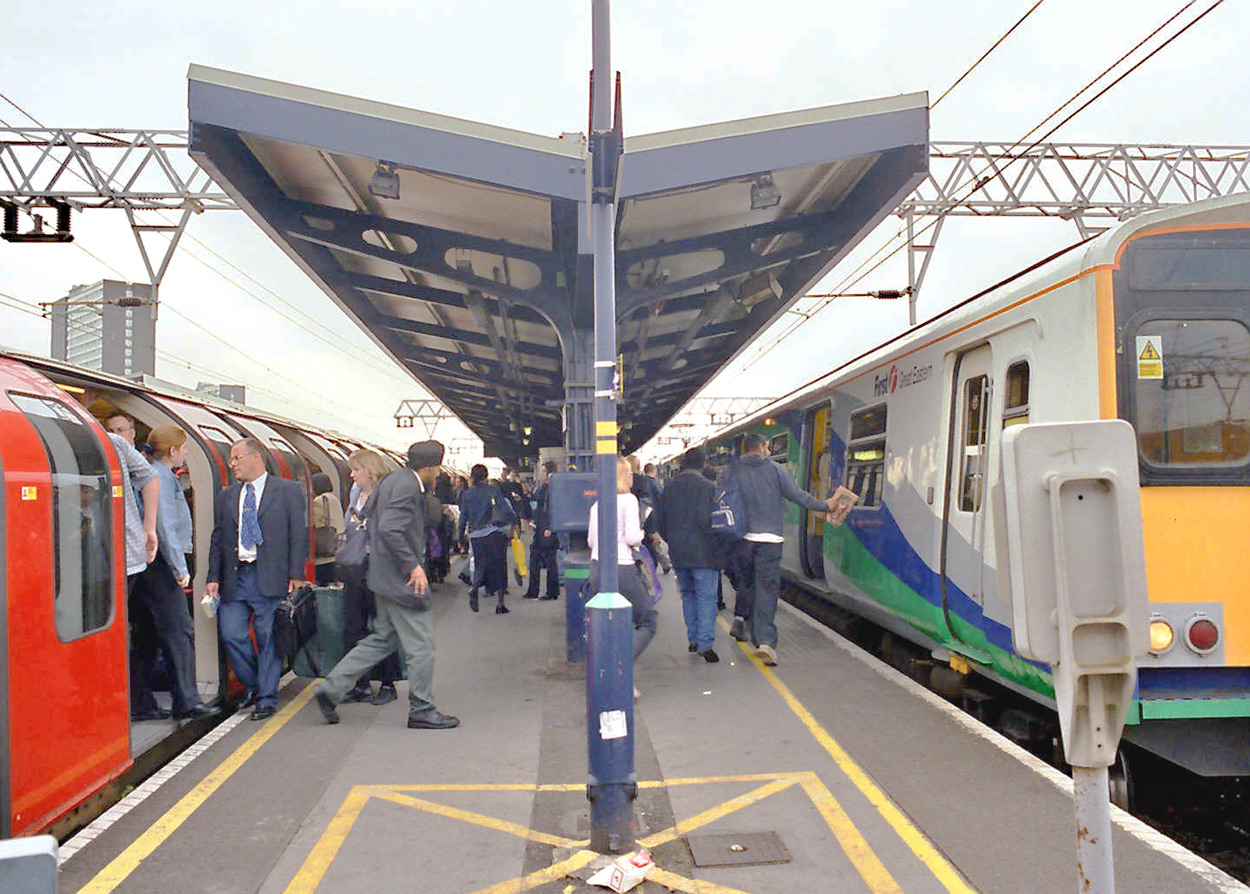
Stratford Station in London is shared by London Underground trains (left) and main line rail services (right), as well as the Docklands Light Railway (not shown).

Since the 1980s, trams have incorporated several features of rapid transit: light rail systems (trams) run on their own rights-of-way, thus avoiding congestion; they remain on the same level as buses and cars. Some light rail systems have elevated or underground sections. Both new and upgraded tram systems allow faster speed and higher capacity, and are a cheap alternative to construction of rapid transit, especially in smaller cities.

A premetro design means that an underground rapid transit system is built in the city center, but only a light rail or tram system in the suburbs. Conversely, other cities have opted to build a full metro in the suburbs, but run trams in city streets to save the cost of expensive tunnels. In North America, interurbans were constructed as street-running suburban trams, without the grade-separation of rapid transit. Premetros also allow a gradual upgrade of existing tramways to rapid transit, thus spreading the investment costs over time. They are most common in Germany with the name Stadtbahn.

Suburban commuter rail is a heavy rail system that operates at a lower frequency than urban rapid transit, with higher average speeds, often only serving one station in each village and town. Commuter rail systems of some cities (such as German S-Bahns, Jakarta's KRL Commuterline, Mumbai Suburban Railway, Australian suburban networks, Danish S-tog etc.) can be seen as the substitute for the city's rapid transit system providing frequent mass transit within city. In contrast, the mainly urban rapid transit systems in some cities (such as the Dubai Metro, Shanghai Metro, MetroSur of the Madrid Metro, Taipei Metro, Kuala Lumpur Rapid Transit etc.) have lines that fan out to reach the outer suburbs. With some other urban or "near urban" rapid transit systems (Guangfo Metro, Bay Area Rapid Transit, Los Teques Metro and Seoul Subway Line 7, etc.) serving bi- and multi-nucleus agglomerations.

Some cities have opted for two tiers of urban railways: an urban rapid transit system (such as the Paris Métro, Berlin U-Bahn, London Underground, Sydney Metro, Tokyo subway, Jakarta MRT and Philadelphia Subway) and a suburban system (such as their counterparts RER, S-Bahn, Crossrail & London Overground, Sydney Trains, JR Urban Lines, KRL Commuterline and Regional Rail respectively). Such systems are known variously as S-trains, suburban service, or (sometimes) regional rail. The suburban systems may have their own purpose built trackage, run at similar "rapid transit-like" frequencies, and (in many countries) are operated by the national railway company. In some cities these suburban services run through tunnels in the city center and have direct transfers to the rapid transit system, on the same or adjoining platforms.

In some cases, such as the London Underground and the London Overground, suburban and rapid transit systems even run on the exact same track along some sections. California's BART, Federal District's Metrô-DF and Washington's Metrorail system is an example of a hybrid of the two: in the suburbs the lines function like a commuter rail line, with longer intervals and longer distance between stations; in the downtown areas, the stations become closer together and many lines interline with intervals dropping to typical rapid transit headways.

== Costs, benefits, and impacts ==
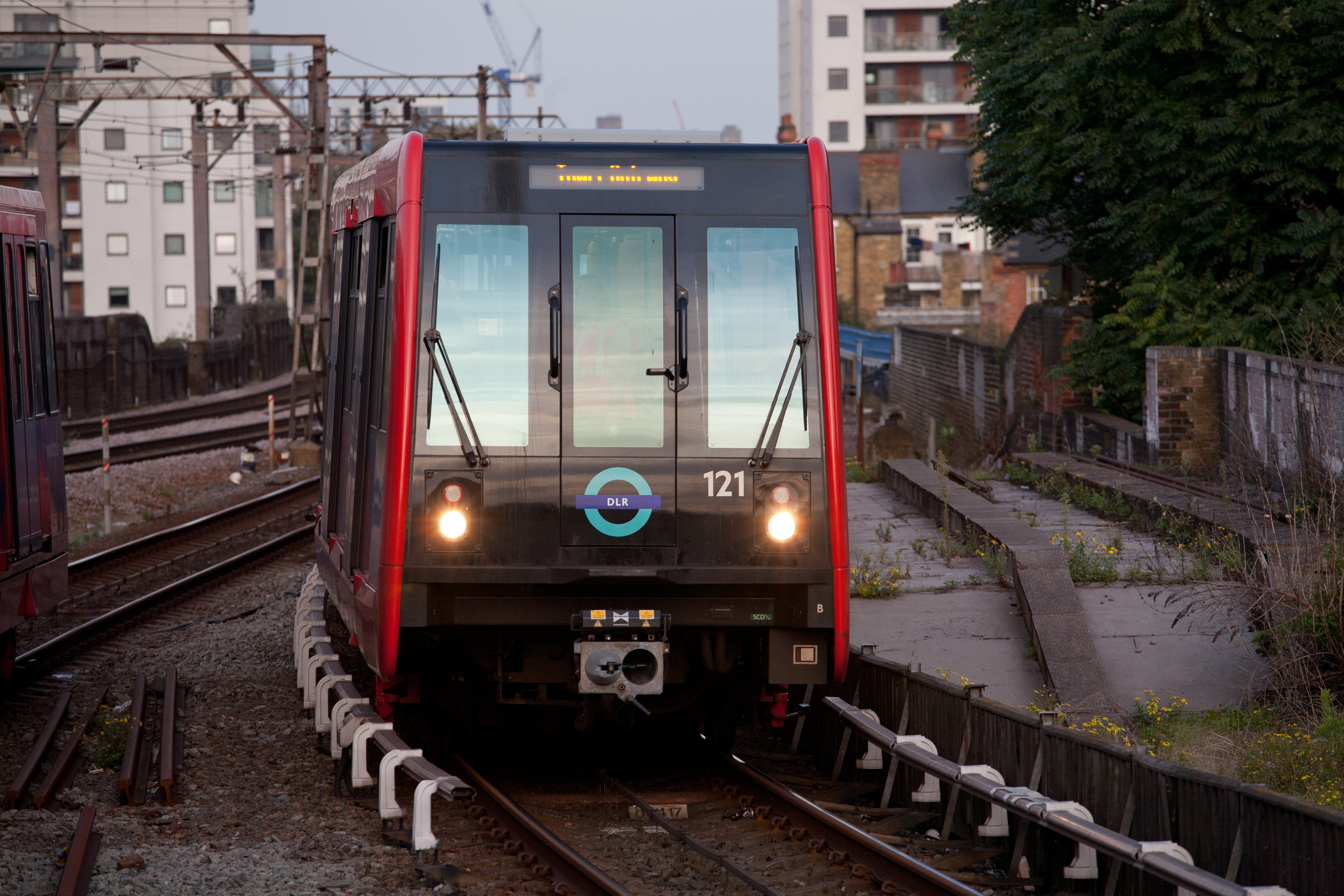
The Docklands Light Railway in London allows for dense land use, while retaining a high capacity.

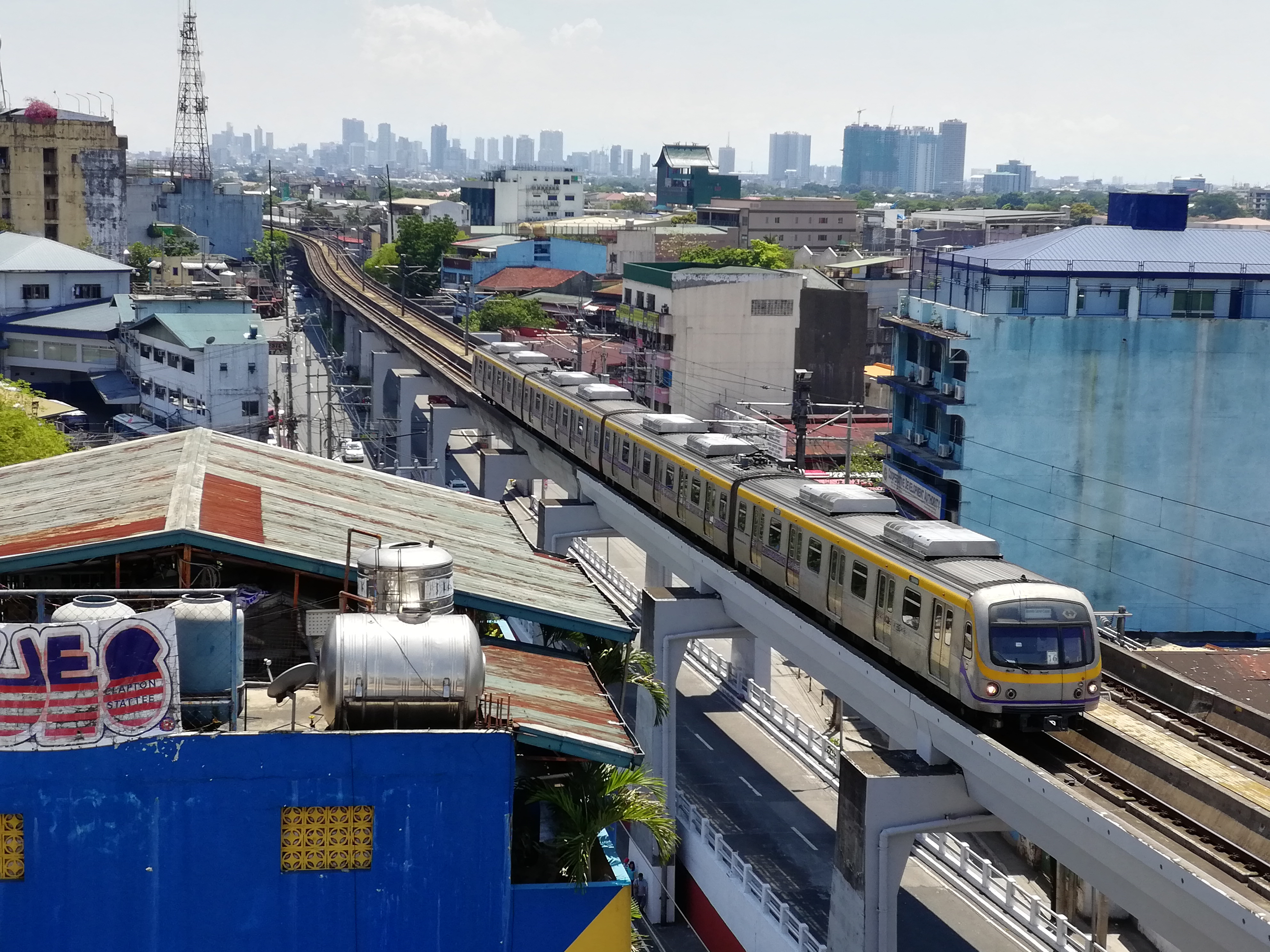
Elevated lines are generally cheaper to build than underground lines. (Manila Line 2)

As of March 2018, 212 cities have built rapid transit systems. The capital cost is high, as is the risk of cost overrun and benefit shortfall; public financing is normally required. Rapid transit is sometimes seen as an alternative to an extensive road transport system with many motorways; the rapid transit system allows higher capacity with less land use, less environmental impact, and a lower cost. A 2023 study found that rapid transit systems lead to a massive reduction in CO_{2} emissions.

Elevated or underground systems in city centers allow the transport of people without occupying expensive land, and permit the city to develop compactly without physical barriers. Motorways often depress nearby residential land values, but proximity to a rapid transit station often triggers commercial and residential growth, with large transit oriented development office and housing blocks being constructed. Also, an efficient transit system can decrease the economic welfare loss caused by the increase of population density in a metropolis.

Rapid transit systems have high fixed costs. Most systems are publicly owned, by either local governments, transit authorities or national governments. Capital investments are often partially or completely financed by taxation, rather than by passenger fares, but must often compete with funding for roads. The transit systems may be operated by the owner or by a private company through a public service obligation. The owners of the systems often also own the connecting bus or rail systems, or are members of the local transport association, allowing for free transfers between modes. Almost all transit systems operate at a deficit, requiring fare revenue, advertising and government funding to cover costs.

The farebox recovery ratio, a ratio of ticket income to operating costs, is often used to assess operational profitability, with some systems including Hong Kong's MTR Corporation, and Taipei achieving recovery ratios of well over 100%. This ignores both heavy capital costs incurred in building the system, which are often funded with soft loans and whose servicing is excluded from calculations of profitability, as well as ancillary revenue such as income from real estate portfolios. Some systems, particularly Hong Kong's, extensions are partly financed by the sale of land whose value has appreciated by the new access the extension has brought to the area, a process known as value capture.

Urban land-use planning policies are essential for the success of rapid transit systems, particularly as mass transit is not feasible in low-density communities. Transportation planners estimate that to support rapid rail services, there must be a residential housing density of twelve dwelling units per acre.

== See also ==
- Bus rapid transit
- List of metro systems
- Light rail transit
- Megaproject
- Personal rapid transit
- Regional rail
- Rapid transit track gauge
- List of countries by metro rail network size
