= List of Lille Metro stations =

Map of the Lille Metro network.

There are currently 60 stations on the Lille Metro network operated by ilévia. The first section to open was Line 1, which began operation on April 25, 1983, between Quatre Cantons and République; it holds the distinction of being the world's first fully automated driverless metro line.

As of 2025, the network extends approximately 45 km (28 mi) and consists of 2 lines (Line 1 and Line 2). These lines converge in central Lille at Gare Lille-Flandres, which serves as a major multimodal hub connecting the metro, tramway, regional TER trains, and high-speed TGV services.

== Stations ==
=== Line 1 ===
Station	Connections	Municipalities served	Locations
Quatre Cantons - Stade Pierre-Mauroy		Villeneuve-d'Ascq (Cité scientifique)	50° 36′ 19″ N, 3° 08′ 21″ E
Cité Scientifique - Professeur Gabillard		Villeneuve-d'Ascq (Cité scientifique)	50° 36′ 42″ N, 3° 08′ 33″ E
Triolo		Villeneuve-d'Ascq (Triolo)	50° 37′ 01″ N, 3° 08′ 26″ E
Villeneuve-d'Ascq - Hôtel de Ville		Villeneuve-d'Ascq (Hôtel-de-Ville)	50° 37′ 09″ N, 3° 07′ 51″ E
Pont de Bois	TER Hauts-de-France	Villeneuve-d'Ascq (Pont-de-Bois)	50° 37′ 27″ N, 3° 07′ 40″ E
Square Flandres		Lille (Hellemmes)	50° 37′ 31″ N, 3° 06′ 58″ E
Mairie d'Hellemmes		Lille (Hellemmes)	50° 37′ 37″ N, 3° 06′ 33″ E
Marbrerie		Lille (Fives)	50° 37′ 48″ N, 3° 05′ 53″ E
Fives		Lille (Fives)	50° 37′ 59″ N, 3° 05′ 26″ E
Madeleine Caulier		Lille (Fives)	50° 38′ 12″ N, 3° 05′ 14″ E
Gare Lille-Flandres	(Line 2) (Grand Boulevard Tramway) TER Hauts-de-France TGV inOui and Ouigo	Lille (Lille-Flandres)	50° 38′ 14″ N, 3° 04′ 15″ E
Rihour		Lille (Lille-Centre)	50° 38′ 08″ N, 3° 03′ 46″ E
République - Beaux-Arts		Lille (Lille-Centre)	50° 37′ 54″ N, 3° 03′ 39″ E
Gambetta		Lille (Wazemmes)	50° 37′ 35″ N, 3° 03′ 08″ E
Wazemmes		Lille (Wazemmes)	50° 37′ 24″ N, 3° 03′ 06″ E
Porte des Postes	(Line 2)	Lille (Moulins)	50° 37′ 06″ N, 3° 03′ 00″ E
CHU - Centre Oscar-Lambret	TER Hauts-de-France	Lille (Lille-Sud)	50° 36′ 47″ N, 3° 02′ 11″ E
CHU - Eurasanté		Lille (Lille-Sud)	50° 36′ 29″ N, 3° 02′ 20″ E

=== Line 2 ===
Station	Connections	Municipalities served	Location
Saint-Philibert		Lille (Lomme)	50° 39′ 08″ N, 2° 58′ 27″ E
Bourg		Lille (Lomme)	50° 38′ 44″ N, 2° 59′ 07″ E
Maison des Enfants		Lille (Lomme)	50° 38′ 46″ N, 2° 59′ 41″ E
Mitterie		Lille (Lomme)	50° 38′ 49″ N, 3° 00′ 28″ E
Pont Supérieur		Lille (Lomme)	50° 38′ 41″ N, 3° 00′ 50″ E
Lomme - Lambersart - Arthur-Notebart		Lille (Lomme), Lambersart	50° 38′ 27″ N, 3° 01′ 07″ E
Canteleu - Euratechnologies		Lille (Bois-Blancs)	50° 38′ 14″ N, 3° 01′ 28″ E
Bois Blancs		Lille (Bois-Blancs)	50° 38′ 04″ N, 3° 01′ 50″ E
Port de Lille		Lille (Vauban-Esquermes)	50° 37′ 49″ N, 3° 02′ 07″ E
Cormontaigne		Lille (Vauban-Esquermes)	50° 37′ 34″ N, 3° 02′ 25″ E
Montebello		Lille (Vauban-Esquermes)	50° 37′ 19″ N, 3° 02′ 44″ E
Porte des Postes	(Line 1)	Lille (Wazemmes)	50° 37′ 06″ N, 3° 03′ 00″ E
Porte d'Arras		Lille (Moulins)	50° 37′ 03″ N, 3° 03′ 44″ E
Porte de Douai - Jardin des Plantes		Lille (Moulins)	50° 37′ 05″ N, 3° 04′ 20″ E
Porte de Valenciennes		Lille (Moulins)	50° 37′ 16″ N, 3° 04′ 44″ E
Lille Grand Palais		Lille (Lille-Centre)	50° 37′ 46″ N, 3° 04′ 30″ E
Mairie de Lille		Lille (Lille-Centre)	50° 37′ 57″ N, 3° 04′ 15″ E
Gare Lille-Flandres	(Line 1) (Grand Boulevard Tramway); TER Hauts-de-France; TGV inOui and Ouigo	Lille (Lille-Flandres)	50° 38′ 14″ N, 3° 04′ 15″ E
Gare Lille-Europe	TER-GV TGV inOui; Eurostar	Lille (Lille-Europe)	50° 38′ 22″ N, 3° 04′ 35″ E
Saint-Maurice Pellevoisin		Lille (Lille-Europe)	50° 38′ 32″ N, 3° 05′ 19″ E
Mons Sarts		Mons-en-Barœul	50° 38′ 31″ N, 3° 05′ 56″ E
Mairie de Mons		Mons-en-Barœul	50° 38′ 32″ N, 3° 06′ 35″ E
Fort de Mons		Mons-en-Barœul, Villeneuve-d'Ascq	50° 38′ 31″ N, 3° 07′ 10″ E
Les Prés - Edgard-Pisani		Villeneuve-d'Ascq	50° 39′ 00″ N, 3° 07′ 35″ E
Jean-Jaurès		Villeneuve-d'Ascq	50° 39′ 31″ N, 3° 08′ 06″ E
Wasquehal - Pavé de Lille		Wasquehal	50° 39′ 51″ N, 3° 07′ 49″ E
Wasquehal - Hôtel de Ville		Wasquehal	50° 40′ 11″ N, 3° 07′ 52″ E
Croix - Centre		Croix	50° 40′ 27″ N, 3° 08′ 48″ E
Mairie de Croix		Croix	50° 40′ 45″ N, 3° 09′ 21″ E
Épeule - Montesquieu		Roubaix	50° 41′ 03″ N, 3° 09′ 48″ E
Roubaix - Charles-de-Gaulle		Roubaix	50° 41′ 12″ N, 3° 10′ 11″ E
Eurotéléport		Roubaix	50° 41′ 27″ N, 3° 10′ 46″ E
Roubaix - Grand-Place		Roubaix	50° 41′ 31″ N, 3° 10′ 29″ E
Gare Jean-Lebas Roubaix	TER Hauts-de-France; TGV inOui	Roubaix	50° 41′ 44″ N, 3° 09′ 49″ E
Alsace - Plaine Images		Roubaix	50° 42′ 01″ N, 3° 09′ 40″ E
Mercure		Tourcoing	50° 42′ 18″ N, 3° 09′ 38″ E
Carliers		Tourcoing	50° 42′ 39″ N, 3° 09′ 36″ E
Gare de Tourcoing	TER Hauts-de-France TGV inOui and Ouigo	Tourcoing	50° 43′ 00″ N, 3° 09′ 46″ E
Tourcoing - Centre		Tourcoing	50° 43′ 18″ N, 3° 09′ 35″ E
Colbert		Tourcoing	50° 43′ 32″ N, 3° 09′ 24″ E
Phalempins		Tourcoing	50° 43′ 57″ N, 3° 09′ 28″ E
Pont de Neuville		Tourcoing	50° 44′ 12″ N, 3° 10′ 17″ E
Bourgogne		Tourcoing	50° 44′ 22″ N, 3° 10′ 47″ E
CH Dron		Tourcoing	50° 44′ 37″ N, 3° 10′ 51″ E
