= Lille Metro Line 2 =

French metro line

Line 2
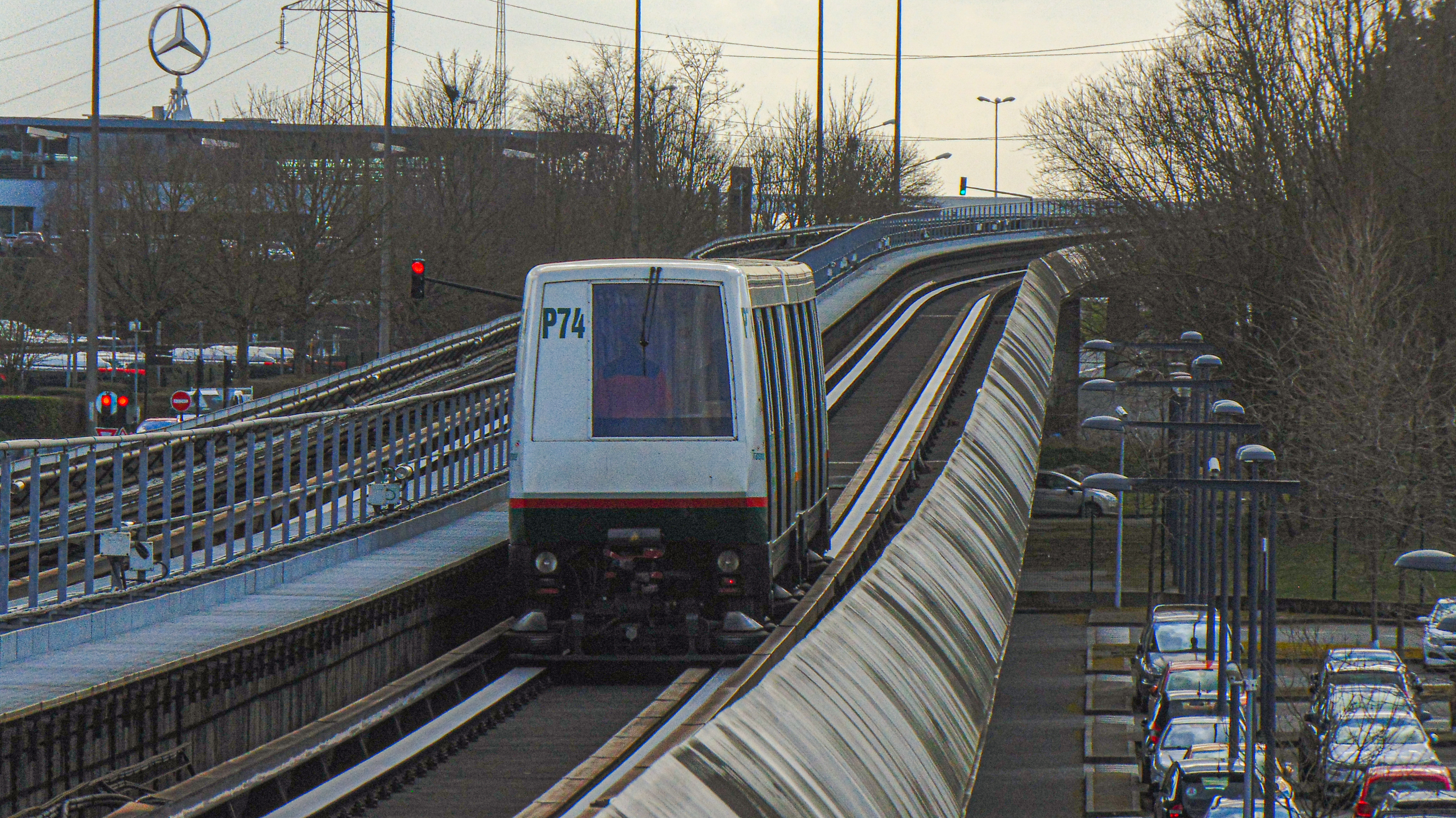
- A VAL 206 train leaves Les Prés - Edgard-Pisani station in Villeneuve-d'Ascq.

Overview
- Termini: Lille Metro; Saint-Philibert ↔ CH Dron Communes served 8
- Connecting lines: Line 1

Service
- Operator: Ilévia

History
- Opened: April 1, 1989
- Last extension: October 27, 2000

Technical
- Line length: 31.130 km (19.343 mi)
- Conduction system: Automatic (VAL)

Line 2 of the Lille Metro is one of the two automated metro lines serving the Lille metropolitan area. It connects the cities of Lille, Roubaix, and Tourcoing, and also serves the municipalities of Mons-en-Barœul, Villeneuve-d'Ascq, Wasquehal, and Croix. The line runs from Saint-Philibert station, located in the Lomme district of Lille, to CH Dron station in Tourcoing, near the Belgian border.

Line 2 was inaugurated on April 1, 1989, initially operating between Saint-Philibert and stations under the name Line 1 bis. It was later extended northeastward in several phases: to Gare Lille-Europe in 1994, Fort de Mons in 1995, Tourcoing–Centre in 1999, and CH Dron on October 27, 2000. By 2013, the line had reached a daily ridership of approximately 180,000 passengers.

With a total length of 31.1 km, including 25.9 km of underground track, it comprises forty-four stations. Line 2 is the longest metro line in France. From 1989 to 1999, the rolling stock consisted solely of VAL 206 trains. Since 1999, some VAL 208 units have also operated on the line. The VAL (Véhicule Automatique Léger, or Light Automated Vehicle) technology was developed at the University of Science and Technology of Lille.

== History ==
=== Origins of Line 1 bis ===
In 1974, the EPALE (Établissement public d'aménagement de Lille-Est), with the support of Arthur Notebart, president of the Urban Community of Lille (CUDL), proposed a public transport development plan for the Lille metropolitan area, which included the construction of four metro lines. (Note: Barré 1980, p. 213) The first line was prioritized by the CUDL due to its route connecting Lille 1 and Lille III universities in Villeneuve-d'Ascq to the Lille University Hospital via the city center. This decision was met with opposition from stakeholders in Roubaix, Tourcoing, and the local Chamber of Commerce, who favored a corridor between Lille, Roubaix, and Tourcoing as the principal axis of the network. (Note: Barré 1980, p. 215) The scale of the project led to a significant increase in projected costs, rising from 230 million to 875 million francs.

Construction of the first line was undertaken between 1977 and 1983 by Matra and SOFRETU. It opened partially on April 25, 1983, between Quatre Cantons and République stations, and was extended a year later to CHR B-Calmette. The line quickly proved successful, registering over thirteen million passengers between May 1983 and March 1984.

Following extensive debate and a narrow vote, the Urban Community of Lille (CUDL) approved the final route for the western extension of Line 1 bis and authorized the start of construction on February 3, 1984. The chosen western terminus was located in Lomme, replacing the initially proposed terminus in Lambersart, which lies further east. The decision was influenced by lobbying efforts from western Lille officials, including the mayor of Lomme, Arthur Notebart, who played a key role in securing support for the revised alignment.

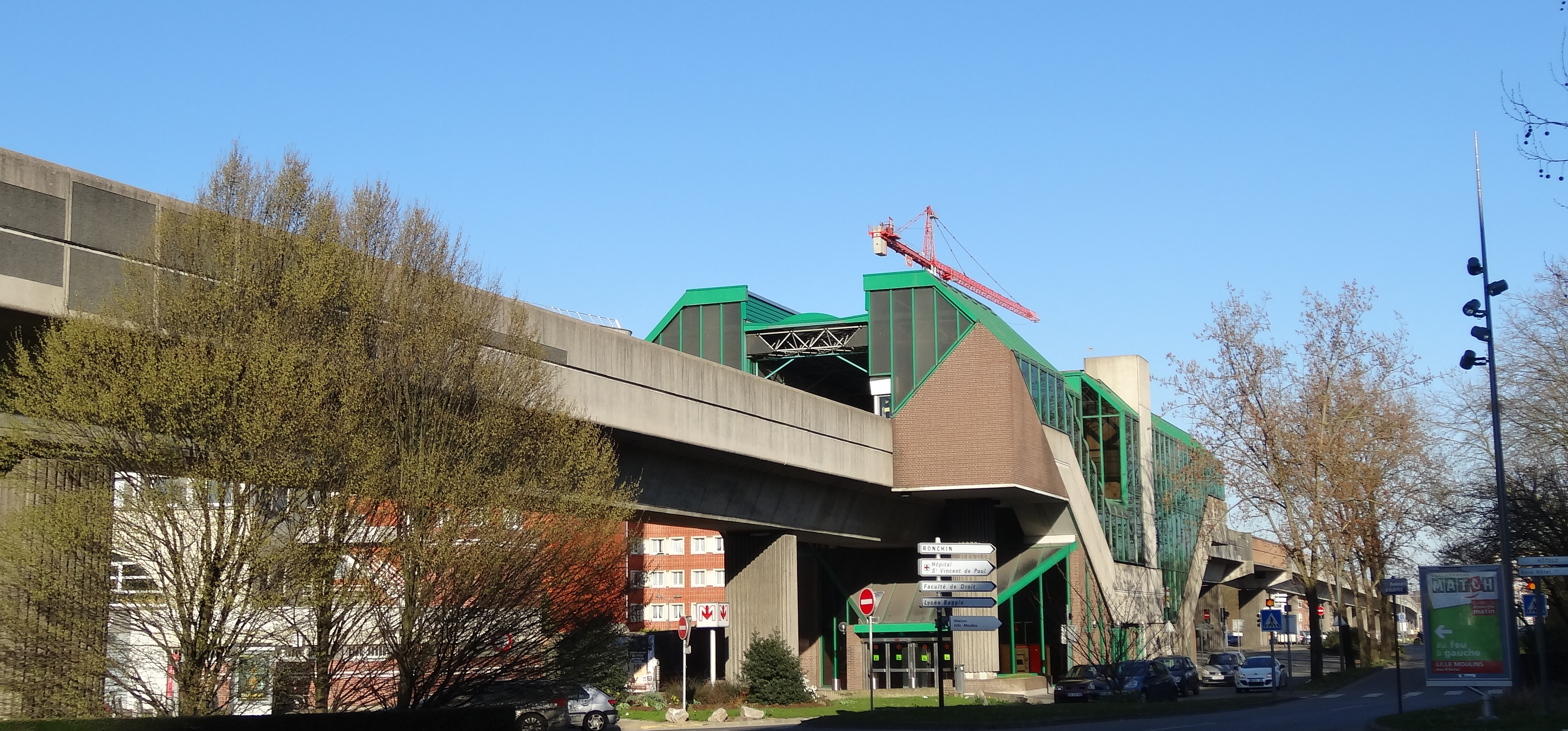
Located on the western section of line 1 bis, Porte d'Arras station opened in April 1989.

The decision to proceed with Line 1 bis was met with skepticism due to financial concerns, as the cost of Line 1 was estimated at over 2 billion francs. The Urban Community of Lille expressed apprehension about funding a second metro line.

Construction of Line 1 bis began in April 1985. A train depot was established beyond the Saint-Philibert terminus in Lomme. The first section completed was the Saint-Philibert viaduct, followed by the second viaduct between Porte des Postes and Foire Commerciale. Additional segments included cut-and-cover sections and tunnel-bored portions extending to the Gares station terminus. Major station construction took place in 1987, and track installation was completed in 1988. The tracks featured a running surface and lateral guide rails composed of H-shaped beams. These running beams were unusually wide and grooved to improve braking performance.

Line 1 bis became operational by late 1988, followed by four months of test runs. The control center, (Note: Sources differ on the meaning of the acronym PCC. It may stand for poste de commande et de contrôle (command and control post), poste central de contrôle (central control post), or poste de commande centralisée (centralized command post). Transpole even refers to it as PC Métro.) originally in Villeneuve-d'Ascq, was moved to Gares station for improved efficiency. The line opened to the public on April 1, 1989, with free travel provided on April 1 and 2. The official inauguration occurred on April 28, 1989, attended by CUDL officials and Matra president Arnaud Lagardère, after a delay due to technical issues.

=== Name change and extensions ===
The CUDL held discussions on extending the metro line northeast along Grand Boulevard toward Roubaix and Tourcoing, proposing to replace the Mongy tramway, whose future is regularly discussed at CUDL. The plan faced opposition from the mayors of Mons-en-Barœul, La Madeleine, and Marcq-en-Barœul. Mons-en-Barœul sought inclusion after being excluded from Line 1's route, while La Madeleine and Marcq-en-Barœul opposed the construction of a viaduct along Grand Boulevard.

In 1989 and 1990, the CUDL voted to abandon the Grand Boulevard route for the Line 1 bis extension, choosing an alternative path that included Mons-en-Barœul, distinct from the existing tramway. The CUDL also decided to renovate the tramway, awarding the contract to Breda. These decisions followed Pierre Mauroy's appointment as CUDL head, succeeding Arthur Notebart, with support from mayors of major cities not yet served by the metro.

To fund a significant extension project, the Communauté Urbaine de Dunkerque (CUDL) sought support from the European Union. Leveraging the Interreg program to foster collaboration with Belgium and promote European integration, the CUDL obtained financing from the European Regional Development Fund. This enabled the completion of a 20-kilometer extension, with a budget of 6.8 billion francs.

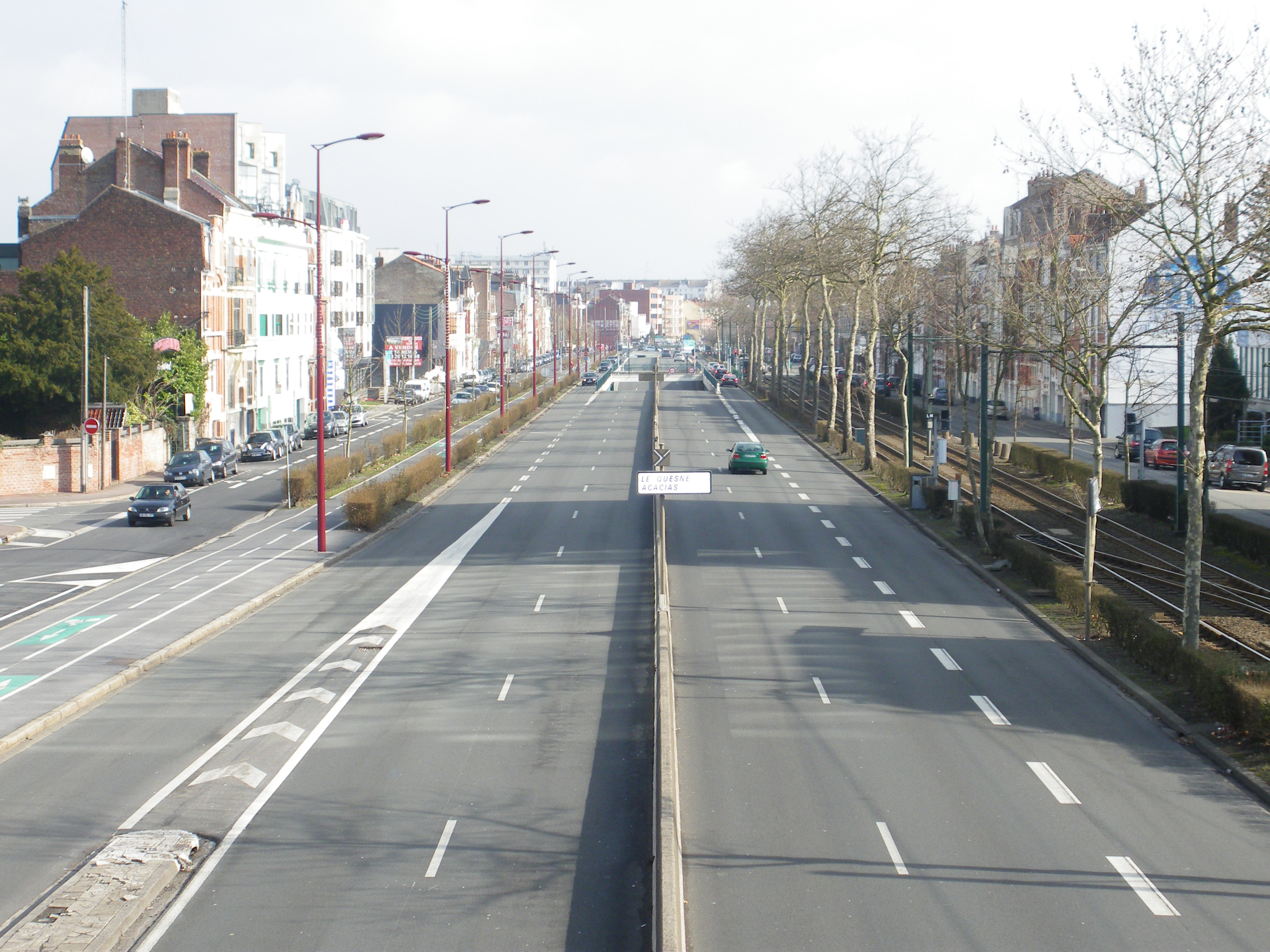
Initially planned within the Urban Community, the route of the second line via the Grand Boulevard has been cancelled.

The initial extension of Line 1 bis of the Lille Metro involved constructing a station to connect the Lille-Europe station and the Euralille district with the rest of Lille, prompted by the arrival of the LGV Nord high-speed rail line. The 500-meter section and Lille-Europe station station opened in May 1994. Concurrently, Gares station was renamed Lille-Flandres station, and Line 1 bis was redesignated as Line 2.

Line 2 was further extended eastward to Mons-en-Barœul. The 3-kilometer section from Gare Lille-Europe to Fort de Mons, including four new stations (one in Lille and three in Mons-en-Barœul) and the underground Mac Donald depot, became operational in February 1995, with commercial service starting on March 18, 1995.

The third extension of Lille Metro Line 2, the longest at approximately 13 kilometers, connects Fort de Mons to Tourcoing–Centre, passing through Villeneuve-d'Ascq, Wasquehal, Croix, Roubaix, and Tourcoing. Construction began in 1993 with the 1,300-meter Villeneuve-d'Ascq viaduct, which supports the elevated Les Prés station.

The extension was built in multiple sections rather than linearly. One section, a tunnel exceeding 2 kilometers, includes Jean-Jaurès, Wasquehal–Pavé de Lille, and Wasquehal–Hôtel de Ville stations. The tunnel design, consistent with Line 1, features trains descending after each station and ascending before the next to conserve energy and reduce brake wear.

On August 18, 1999, sixteen new stations were opened on Lille Metro Line 2, and the first VAL 208 trains began operating on the network.

The fourth and final extension of Line 2 was inaugurated on October 27, 2000, by Prime Minister Lionel Jospin. This 3-kilometer segment extended from Tourcoing–Centre to CH Dron, adding five new stations in Tourcoing. Commercial service began the following day.

=== Increased peak‑hour frequency ===
On January 18, 2021, the Lille Metro Line 2 improved its peak-hour frequency on the central segment between Lomme–Lambersart–Arthur-Notebart and Roubaix–Grand-Place to 1 minute 18 seconds from 1 minute 30 seconds on weekdays, achieved by introducing partial-service trains. The frequency on the remaining sections of the line during peak hours was set to 2 minutes 30 seconds. Additionally, terminus display screens and dedicated audio announcements were implemented.

== Route and stations ==
=== Route overview ===
Geographically exact layout of line 2.

Lille Metro Line 2 extends 31.130 km from Saint-Philibert station in Lomme to CH Dron station in Tourcoing, serving 44 stations across eight municipalities. (Note: The number of municipalities served ranges from eight to nine due to the special status of Lomme, which is an associated municipality of Lille.) The line includes 25.830 km of underground track with 39 stations and 5.300 km of elevated track with 5 stations, with an average inter-station distance of 727 meters. It is the longest metro line in France outside Paris, surpassing Lille's Line 1 and Lyon's Line D, each approximately 13 km. The line was constructed using viaduct, cut-and-cover, and deep tunnel methods.

The line originates at the Grand But depot in Lomme, which houses rolling stock and maintenance facilities. From the depot, the track ascends via a viaduct to Saint-Philibert station, adjacent to the hospital of the same name.

Lille Metro Line 2 descends into a deep tunnel near the Nord-Ouest ring road to reach Bourg station at Place du Maréchal Leclerc. It continues under Avenue de Dunkerque, connecting Lomme, Lambersart, and central Lille, with stations at Maison des Enfants, Mitterie, Pont Supérieur, Lomme–Lambersart–Arthur-Notebart, Canteleu–EuraTechnologies, and Bois Blancs.

The line then passes beneath the two arms of the Deûle River to Port de Lille station and proceeds to Cormontaigne station under its namesake square. It continues in a covered trench along Boulevard Montebello to Montebello station and reaches Porte des Postes station under Place Barthélémy-Dorez, where it connects with Line 1.

Lille Metro Line 2 ascends onto a viaduct above Boulevards Strasbourg, Alsace, and Belfort, following the path of former 19th-century fortifications. Stations along this section—Porte d'Arras, Porte de Douai–Jardin des Plantes, and Porte de Valenciennes—are named after city gates demolished in the early 20th century. The elevated route passes over the former Lille–Saint-Sauveur station before descending into a covered trench to reach Lille Grand Palais station.

From Lille Grand Palais, the line enters a deep tunnel to Mairie de Lille station, then continues beneath central Lille streets to Gare Lille-Flandres, an interchange station with Line 1.

From Gare Lille-Flandres, Lille Metro Line 2 enters a former tramway tunnel, (Note: The central platform at Lille-Flandres station station was the tram terminus between 1983 and 1992.) leading to Lille-Europe station, situated beneath the Lille-Europe railway station. The line continues under the ring road and Rue du Faubourg de Roubaix to Saint-Maurice Pellevoisin, the final station serving the Lille metropolitan area.

The route then descends beneath the urban expressway and enters Mons-en-Barœul via a cut-and-cover trench, serving three central-platform stations: Mons Sarts, Mairie de Mons, and Fort de Mons. After Mons-en-Barœul, the line surfaces to the elevated Les Prés–Edgard-Pisani station in Villeneuve-d'Ascq, crosses the A22 autoroute, and returns underground in a cut-and-cover trench to Jean-Jaurès station, near the avenue of the same name.

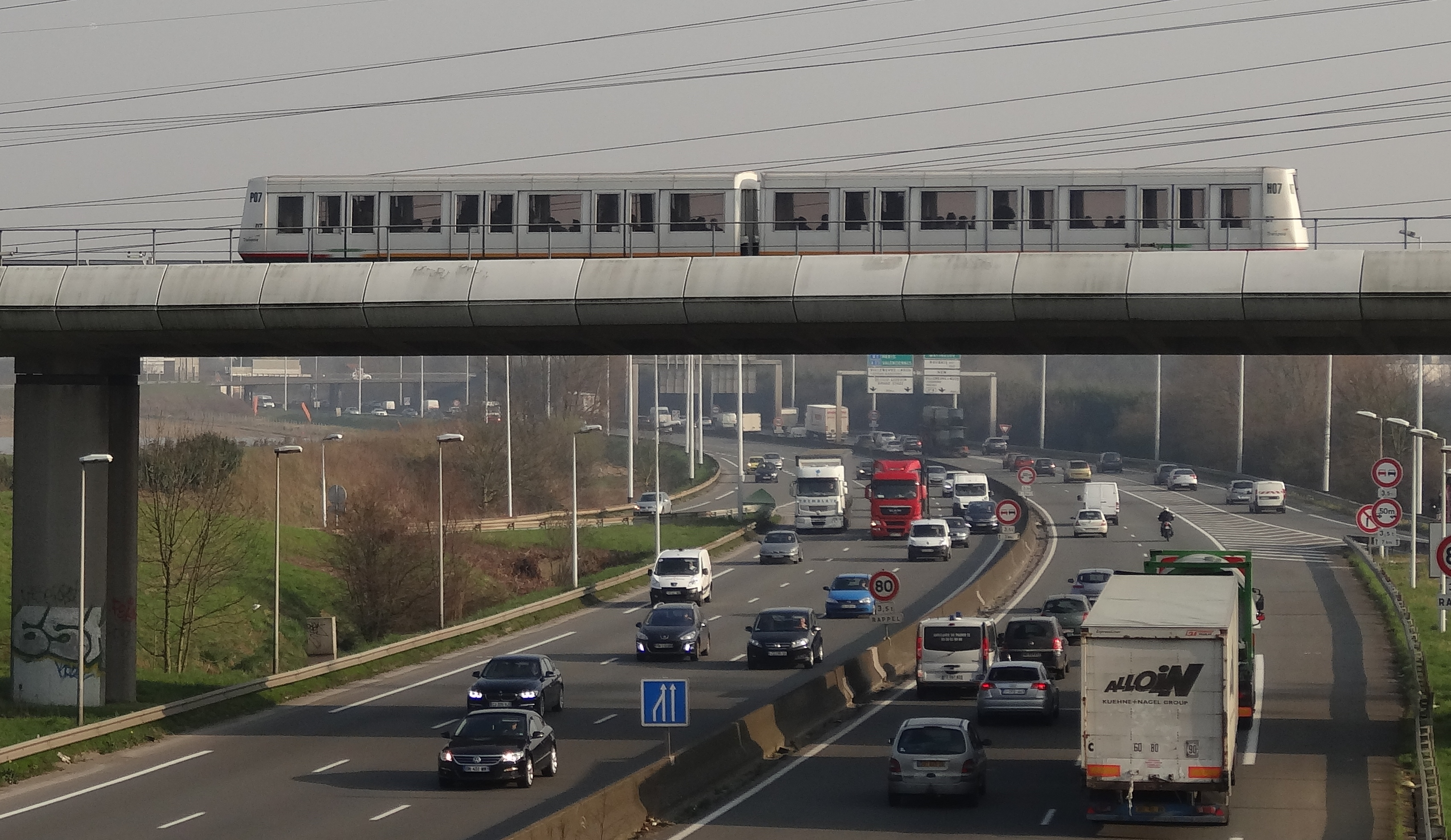
At Villeneuve-d'Ascq, the line passes over the A22 autoroute on a viaduct.

Lille Metro Line 2 proceeds through a deep tunnel beneath the Sart golf course to Wasquehal–Pavé de Lille station in the Pavé de Lille area. It surfaces at Place du Général de Gaulle, where Wasquehal–Hôtel de Ville station is located, before entering Croix. The line passes under Place des Martyrs (Croix–Centre station) and Rue Édouard Herriot (Mairie de Croix station).

Continuing into Roubaix, the line stops at Épeule–Montesquieu station, at the intersection of Boulevard Montesquieu and Rue de Lille, and proceeds along Rue de Lille to Roubaix–Charles-de-Gaulle station, near the intersection with Rue de Soubise.

Lille Metro Line 2 curves to reach Place de la Liberté, serving Eurotéléport station, then passes beneath Grand-Place to Roubaix–Grand-Place station. It curves again to Gare Jean-Lebas Roubaix station, opposite Roubaix railway station, and continues along Boulevard de la République to Alsace–Plaine Images station.

The line crosses under the Roubaix canal and urban expressway to enter Tourcoing, stopping at Mercure station. It proceeds to Carliers station at the intersection of Boulevard Gambetta and Rue des Carliers, then continues through Gare de Tourcoing, Tourcoing–Centre, and Colbert stations. The line surfaces at Place des Phalempins, serving Phalempins station, and continues to Pont de Neuville station. It then passes beneath Rue du Roitelet and Rue du Docteur Schweitzer to Bourgogne station, terminating at CH Dron station at the intersection of Rue du Président Coty and Rue André Gide.

=== List of stations ===
The line includes a total of forty-four stations. Five of them are elevated (Saint-Philibert, Porte d'Arras, Porte de Douai–Jardin des Plantes, Porte de Valenciennes, and Les Prés–Edgard-Pisani), the remainder being underground stations.

Station	Location	Municipalities served	Connections (Note: To simplify the table, only connections with guided transport systems (metros, trains, trams) and connections directly related to the line are listed. Other connections, particularly bus lines, are detailed in each station's individual article.)
Saint-Philibert	50° 39′ 08″ N, 2° 58′ 27″ E	Lille (Lomme)	
Bourg	50° 38′ 44″ N, 2° 59′ 07″ E	Lille (Lomme)	
Maison des Enfants	50° 38′ 46″ N, 2° 59′ 41″ E	Lille (Lomme)	
Mitterie	50° 38′ 49″ N, 3° 00′ 28″ E	Lille (Lomme)	
Pont Supérieur	50° 38′ 41″ N, 3° 00′ 50″ E	Lille (Lomme)	
Lomme–Lambersart–Arthur-Notebart	50° 38′ 27″ N, 3° 01′ 07″ E	Lille (Lomme), Lambersart	
Canteleu–EuraTechnologies	50° 38′ 14″ N, 3° 01′ 28″ E	Lille (Bois-Blancs)	
Bois Blancs	50° 38′ 04″ N, 3° 01′ 50″ E	Lille (Bois-Blancs)	
Port de Lille	50° 37′ 49″ N, 3° 02′ 07″ E	Lille (Vauban-Esquermes)	
Cormontaigne	50° 37′ 34″ N, 3° 02′ 25″ E	Lille (Vauban-Esquermes)	
Montebello	50° 37′ 19″ N, 3° 02′ 44″ E	Lille (Vauban-Esquermes)	
Porte des Postes	50° 37′ 06″ N, 3° 03′ 00″ E	Lille (Wazemmes)	(Line 1)
Porte d'Arras	50° 37′ 03″ N, 3° 03′ 44″ E	Lille (Moulins)	
Porte de Douai–Jardin des Plantes	50° 37′ 05″ N, 3° 04′ 20″ E	Lille (Moulins)	
Porte de Valenciennes	50° 37′ 16″ N, 3° 04′ 44″ E	Lille (Moulins]	
Lille Grand Palais	50° 37′ 46″ N, 3° 04′ 30″ E	Lille (Lille-Centre)	
Mairie de Lille	50° 37′ 57″ N, 3° 04′ 15″ E	Lille (Lille-Centre)	
Gare Lille-Flandres	50° 38′ 14″ N, 3° 04′ 15″ E	Lille (Lille-Flandres)	(Line 1) (Grand Boulevard Tramway); TER Hauts-de-France; TGV inOui and Ouigo
Gare Lille-Europe	50° 38′ 22″ N, 3° 04′ 35″ E	Lille (Lille-Europe)	TER-GV; TGV inOui; Eurostar
Saint-Maurice Pellevoisin	50° 38′ 32″ N, 3° 05′ 19″ E	Lille (Lille-Europe)	
Mons Sarts	50° 38′ 31″ N, 3° 05′ 56″ E	Mons-en-Barœul	
Mairie de Mons	50° 38′ 32″ N, 3° 06′ 35″ E	Mons-en-Barœul	
Fort de Mons	50° 38′ 31″ N, 3° 07′ 10″ E	Mons-en-Barœul, Villeneuve-d'Ascq	
Les Prés–Edgard-Pisani	50° 39′ 00″ N, 3° 07′ 35″ E	Villeneuve-d'Ascq	
Jean-Jaurès	50° 39′ 31″ N, 3° 08′ 06″ E	Villeneuve-d'Ascq	
Wasquehal–Pavé de Lille	50° 39′ 51″ N, 3° 07′ 49″ E	Wasquehal	
Wasquehal–Hôtel de Ville	50° 40′ 11″ N, 3° 07′ 52″ E	Wasquehal	
Croix–Centre	50° 40′ 27″ N, 3° 08′ 48″ E	Croix	
Mairie de Croix	50° 40′ 45″ N, 3° 09′ 21″ E	Croix	
Épeule–Montesquieu	50° 41′ 03″ N, 3° 09′ 48″ E	Roubaix	
Roubaix–Charles-de-Gaulle	50° 41′ 12″ N, 3° 10′ 11″ E	Roubaix	
Eurotéléport	50° 41′ 27″ N, 3° 10′ 46″ E	Roubaix	
Roubaix–Grand-Place	50° 41′ 31″ N, 3° 10′ 29″ E	Roubaix	
Gare Jean-Lebas Roubaix	50° 41′ 44″ N, 3° 09′ 49″ E	Roubaix	TER Hauts-de-France; TGV inOui
Alsace–Plaine Images	50° 42′ 01″ N, 3° 09′ 40″ E	Roubaix	
Mercure	50° 42′ 18″ N, 3° 09′ 38″ E	Tourcoing	
Carliers	50° 42′ 39″ N, 3° 09′ 36″ E	Tourcoing	
Gare de Tourcoing	50° 43′ 00″ N, 3° 09′ 46″ E	Tourcoing	TER Hauts-de-France; TGV inOui and Ouigo
Tourcoing–Centre	50° 43′ 18″ N, 3° 09′ 35″ E	Tourcoing	
Colbert	50° 43′ 32″ N, 3° 09′ 24″ E	Tourcoing	
Phalempins	50° 43′ 57″ N, 3° 09′ 28″ E	Tourcoing	
Pont de Neuville	50° 44′ 12″ N, 3° 10′ 17″ E	Tourcoing	
Bourgogne	50° 44′ 22″ N, 3° 10′ 47″ E	Tourcoing	
CH Dron	50° 44′ 37″ N, 3° 10′ 51″ E	Tourcoing	

=== Stations that have changed names ===
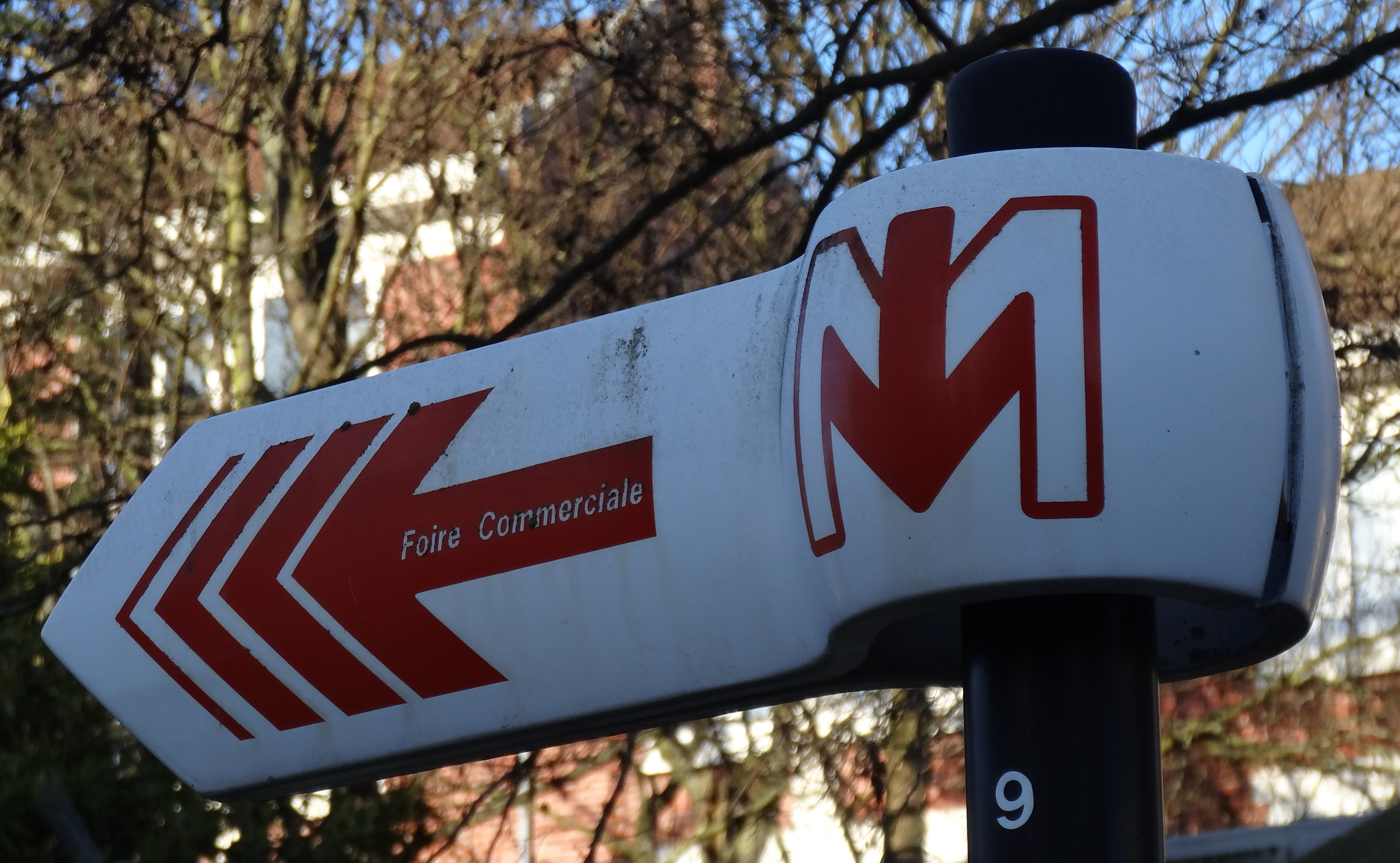
Sign for the Foire Commerciale station, formerly known as Lille Grand Palais.

Several stations on the network have changed names since their inauguration. The station Gares became Gare Lille-Flandres in 1994 following the opening of Gare Lille-Europe station. That same year, Petite Chapelle was renamed Bois Blancs, while Lille Grand Palais replaced Foire Commerciale.

On March 6, 2017, four stations changed names. Les Prés became Les Prés–Edgard-Pisani; Croix–Mairie became Mairie de Croix; Gare–Jean-Lebas and Tourcoing–Sébastopol were renamed Gare Jean-Lebas Roubaix and Gare de Tourcoing, respectively. Six months later, the station Lomme–Lambersart became Lomme–Lambersart–Arthur-Notebart, in tribute to Arthur Notebart, the initiator of the Lille metro.

In April 2024, three stations on the line had their names changed. Canteleu became Canteleu–EuraTechnologies, Porte de Douai was renamed Porte de Douai–Jardin des Plantes, and Alsace became Alsace–Plaine Images.

=== Themed or special stations ===
The Lille Metro, encompassing Lines 1 and 2, was designed with accessibility for people with disabilities and platform screen doors, emphasizing unique architectural styles for each station. Architects collaborated with chosen artists to create distinct station decorations.

Notable artworks include a 900 m² mural by Jean Pattou at Gare Lille-Europe station, which earned a prize from the École Spéciale d'Architecture in 2000. Croix–Centre station features a ceiling mural, (Note: Delemarle 2004, p. 152) while Porte de Valenciennes station displays a large hand sculpture by César, designed to appear as if supporting a pillar. (Note: Delemarle 2004, p. 147) Eurotéléport station has a prominent dome, created by Thierry Baron, Sylvie Castel, and Philippe Louguet, allowing natural light into the station.

=== Phantom station and cancelled extension ===
During the construction of Lille Metro Line 2, a station was planned above the former tracks of Lille-Saint-Sauveur station, between Porte de Valenciennes and Lille Grand Palais. The station is included in the control center's operational programs, but only track reinforcement has been completed, with no structural work constructed. This unbuilt station was referenced in 2009 during discussions about redeveloping the Saint-Sauveur brownfield site.

A proposed extension of Line 2 from Roubaix–Charles-de-Gaulle to Wattrelos was abandoned. A switch installed for this extension remains between Roubaix–Charles-de-Gaulle and Eurotéléport stations, leading either to Eurotéléport or a dead-end.

=== Workshops and depots ===
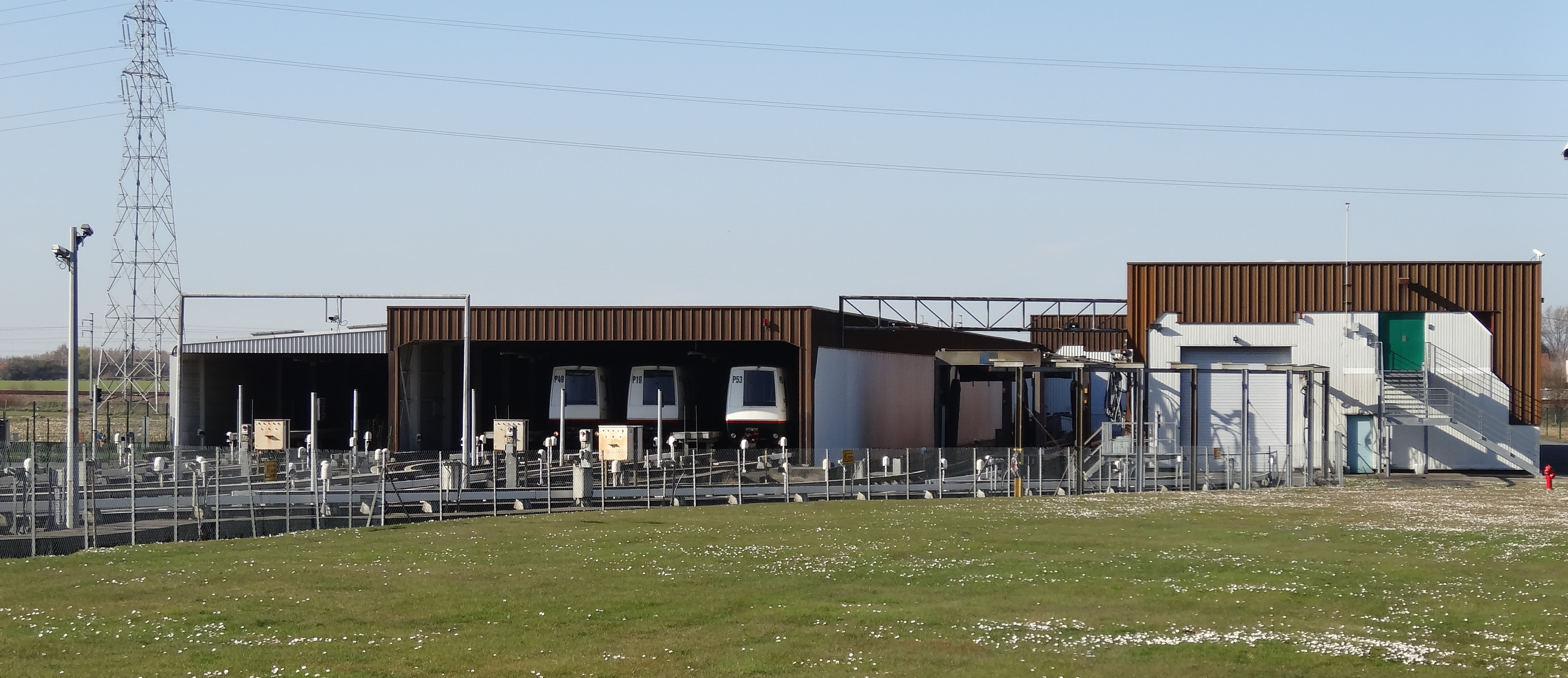
Le Grand But garage-atelier, based in Lomme and open since 1989.

The metro line features maintenance and repair depots at each terminus and a storage depot. Maintenance depots provide upkeep, repairs, and storage, while the storage depot is used solely for train storage.

The Grand But depot, located in Lomme beyond Saint-Philibert station, is the oldest and spans approximately 3,800 m², accommodating up to 36 trains. Its maintenance workshop covers about 1,000 m².

The CH Dron depot, situated in Tourcoing beyond the CH Dron terminus, covers 3,650 m² and can house 30 train sets. Its main workshop, equipped with 12 jack lines, spans nearly one hectare and includes a 400-meter test track.

A storage-only depot, located underground near Fort de Mons station in Mons-en-Barœul, spans approximately 4,000 m² and can accommodate 22 train sets.

== Operation ==
=== Operating hours and frequencies ===
Line 2 operates daily, except on May 1, when service is suspended for maintenance tasks such as track drainage and inspection of automated equipment.

In 2014, weekday and Saturday service began at 5:08 a.m. from CH Dron and 5:12 a.m. from Saint-Philibert. On Sundays, the first trains departed at 6:20 a.m. from CH Dron and 6:24 a.m. from Saint-Philibert. Daily service concluded with the last departures from Gare Lille-Flandres at midnight to CH Dron and 12:30 a.m. to Saint-Philibert and Fort de Mons. After midnight, the Fort de Mons to CH Dron section was inaccessible, with trains terminating at Fort de Mons. (Note: After this time, travelers heading to Roubaix and Tourcoing can use the tramway instead (last departures at 12:30 a.m. for the Lille–Tourcoing branch and 12:45 a.m. for the Lille–Roubaix branch).) For certain events, such as Fête de la Musique, Lille 3000, or Braderie de Lille, extended or continuous overnight service, known as "grande nuit," was provided.

Until 2021, trains on Line 2 operated every 90 seconds during peak hours. Since January 18, 2021, partial services on the central section between Lomme–Lambersart–Arthur-Notebart and Roubaix–Grand-Place stations, from Monday to Friday during 7:00–9:00 a.m. and 4:30–6:45 p.m., reduced the interval to 78 seconds on this section and 150 seconds on the rest of the line. This schedule is suspended in July and August.

During off-peak hours, trains run every two to three minutes. On weekends and public holidays, frequencies are lower, with a minimum of one train every six to eight minutes before 6:00 a.m. and after 10:00 p.m.

=== Rolling stock ===
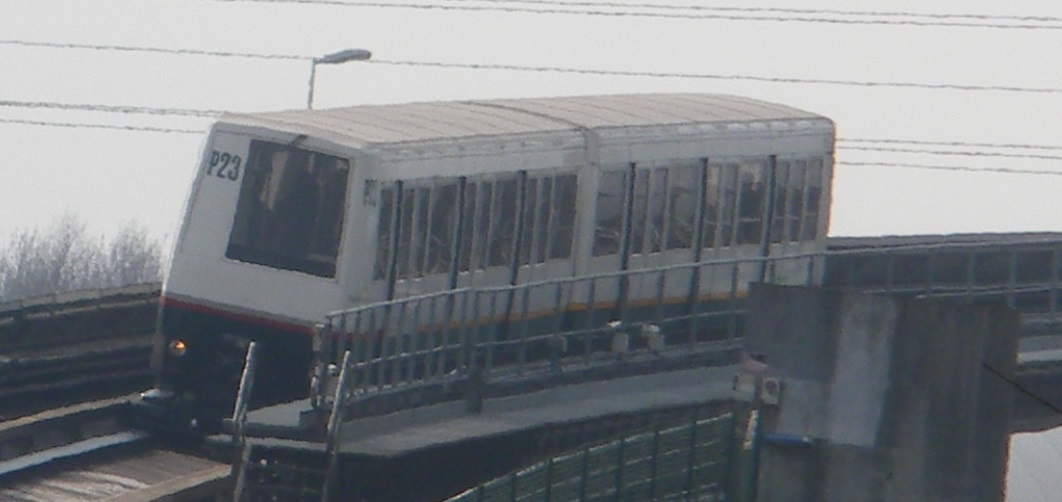
VAL 206

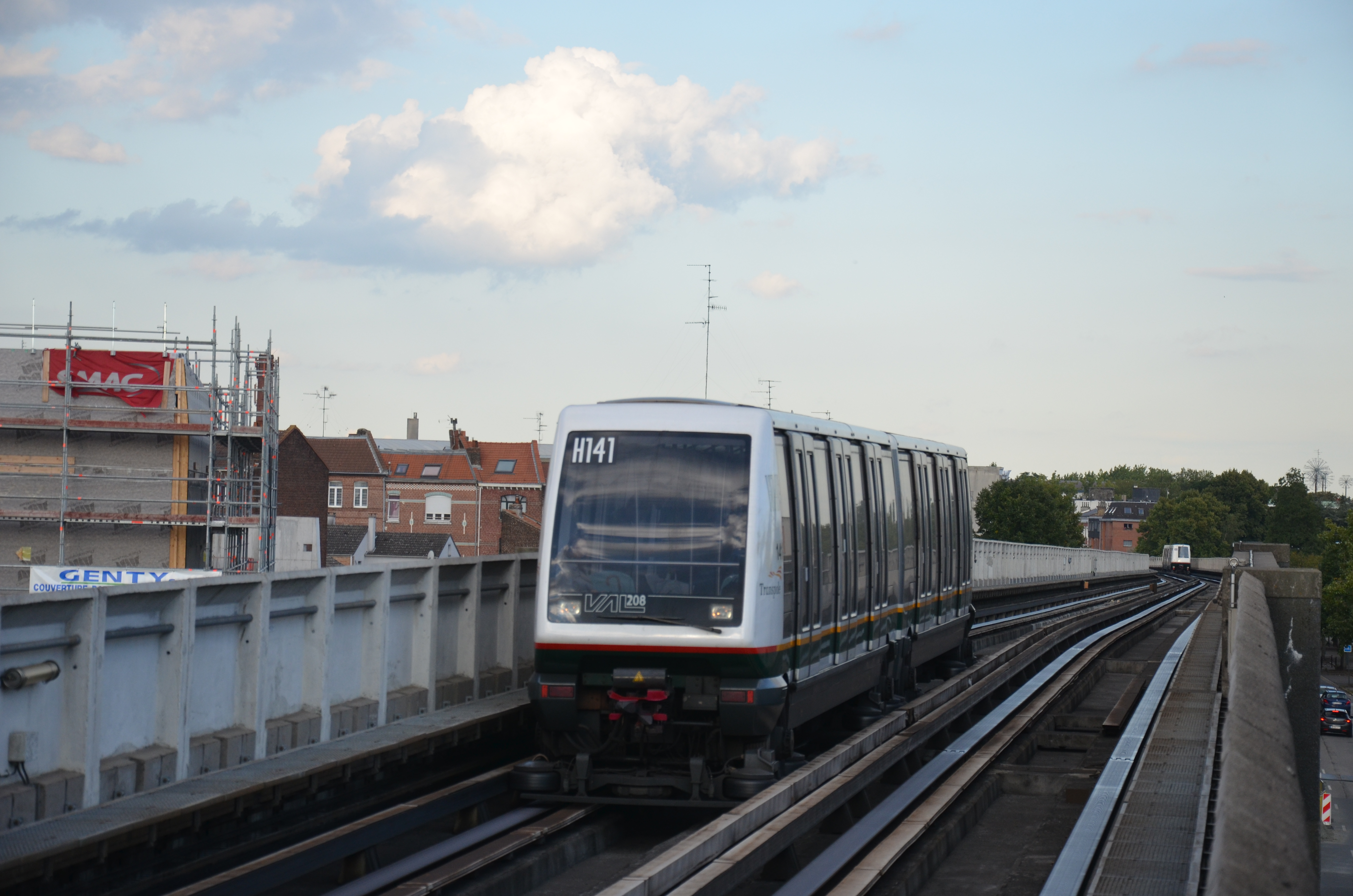
A few VAL 208s run on line 2.

Line 2 primarily operates 83 VAL 206 trainsets, the first generation of rubber-tired automated metro trains developed by Matra in the 1970s in collaboration with the University of Science and Technology of Lille. The acronym VAL, initially standing for Villeneuve-d'Ascq – Lille, was redefined by 1975 as Véhicule Automatique Léger (Light Automated Vehicle).

The VAL 206 trainsets measure 2.06 m in width, 26 m in length, and 3.25 m in height, with interior dimensions of 2.01 m in width and 2.05 m in height. Each trainset can accommodate 160 passengers under normal load (4 standing persons per square meter) and up to 208 passengers under exceptional load (6 persons per square meter).

The VAL 206 trainsets, primarily used on Line 2, were designed for a 30-year lifespan and to cover 2.5 million kilometers. In 2005, Siemens upgraded the automation systems of the 83 VAL 206 trainsets. In 2009, Alstom and Safra refurbished their interiors.

Line 2 also operates seven VAL 208 trainsets. Compared to the VAL 206, which can carry up to 208 passengers under exceptional load (6 persons per square meter), the VAL 208 has a higher capacity, accommodating over 240 passengers under similar conditions.

=== Operating personnel ===
The metro system operates automatically, with trains adjusting their speed based on time and track conditions without human intervention under normal circumstances. Approximately ten Operational Technical Agents (ATOs) oversee the network from the control center (PCC), located beneath Gare Lille-Flandres station.

The PCC control room features video screens connected to station cameras, allowing ATOs to monitor passenger safety and technical operations. Using computers, ATOs supervise metro equipment, manage network start-up and shutdown, and adjust the number of trainsets based on passenger demand.

Their role is to intervene in the event of an operational issue. If necessary, they can halt a train and undertake various procedures to restart it or tow it to a maintenance depot. Operational Technical Agents (ATOs) may also communicate with passengers via the intercom systems available onboard. Additionally, ATOs oversee all maintenance activities conducted both during the day and at night, including tunnel maintenance operations that occur when metro service is suspended.

Customer Service Agents (ISCs) liaise with the control center (PCC) and inspect the condition of stations and trains. Corrective Maintenance Technicians (TMCs) handle train repairs at various depots across the network.

=== Fares and funding ===
==== Fares ====
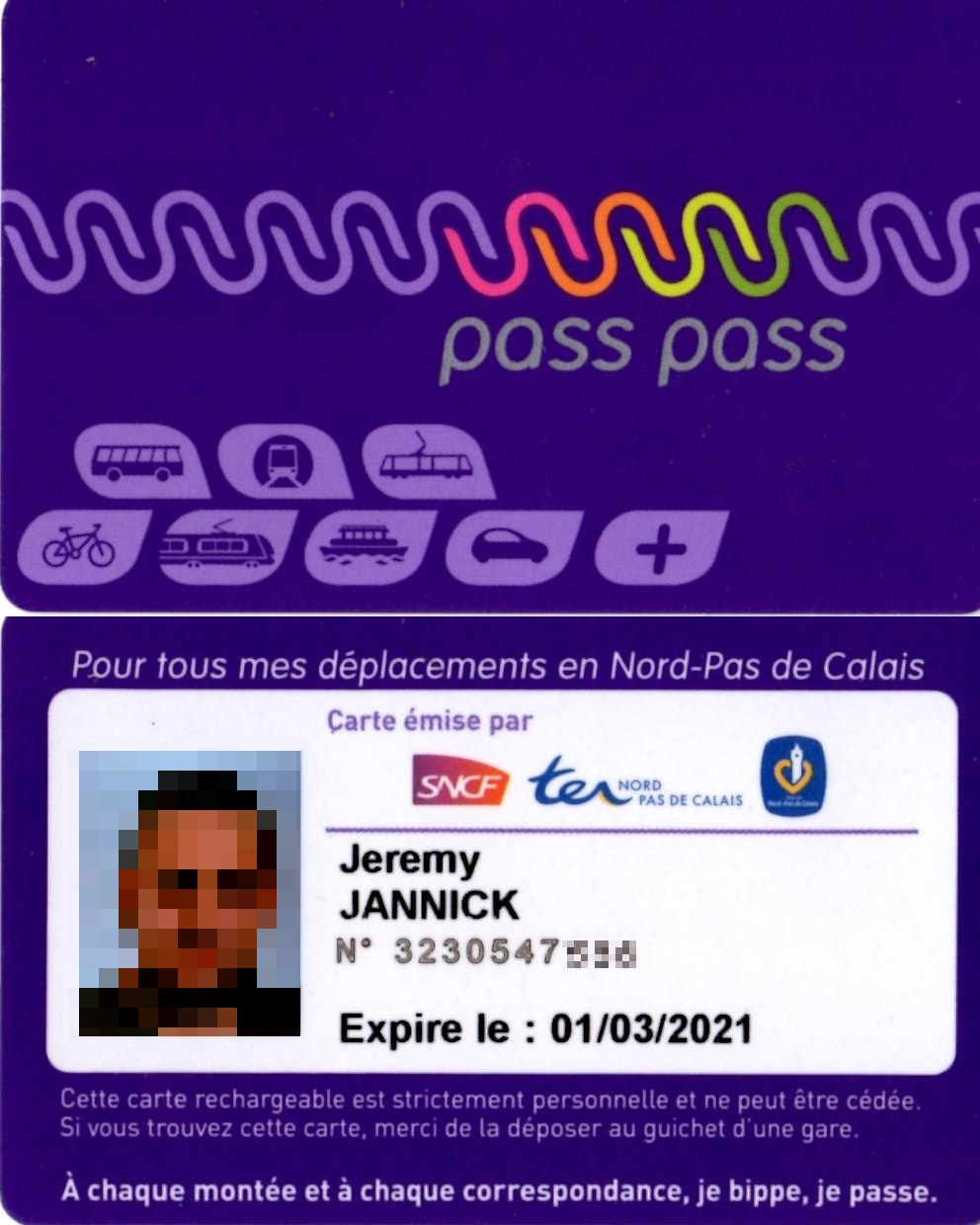
Example of a Pass Pass card.

On June 25, 2013, the Ilévia network introduced Pass Pass contactless smart cards. Paper ticket sales ended on January 1, 2014, with a transition period until June 16, 2014, allowing use of remaining paper tickets. After this date, ticket validators were removed, and users could exchange paper tickets for Pass Pass cards.

The Ilévia network offers three types of Pass Pass contactless smart cards. The personal card, priced at €4, is for subscription holders and valid across all transport modes, including TER Hauts-de-France trains and V'Lille bicycles. The non-personal card, costing €2, allows multiple users for occasional travel. The rechargeable ticket, priced at €0.20, is for infrequent travelers, supports one trip type, is lendable, can be recharged up to ten times, and is refunded on the fifth recharge.

Various fare products can be loaded onto all three types of Pass Pass cards: personal, non-personal, and rechargeable. ZAP tickets, available in physical and virtual formats, can be loaded onto any Pass Pass card. Similarly, 2-day (€7.50) and 3-day (€9.50) passes are compatible with all card types. Rythmo subscriptions, available only in digital format, are exclusive to personal card holders.

Pass Pass cards can be purchased and topped up at participating retailers, ticket machines in metro and tram stations, and Ilévia agencies. Online top-ups are available only for personal card holders. Bus drivers offer card purchases but not top-ups.

==== Funding ====
It is the community council of the European Metropolis of Lille that decides on fare changes for public transport, a responsibility it has held since the dissolution of the mixed transport operating syndicate of the Lille Urban Community on 31 December 2009. The urban community also provides a large part of the funding for public transport. It covers two-thirds of operating costs (estimated in 2010 at fifty million euros), which allows network users to pay only one-third of the actual cost of a trip or a subscription. The intermunicipal body also finances the infrastructure necessary for metro operations (workshops, depots, stations, and tracks) as well as the rolling stock (metro trainsets, buses, and trams).

Other local authorities may also be called upon to contribute to the funding of certain projects. As part of the Grenelle Environnement initiative launched in 2011, the State is partially subsidising the project to double the capacity of Line 1, in the amount of a little over 9 million euros.

In 2013, the Lille Métropole Communauté Urbaine (LMCU) allocated €383 million for mobility and transport, the largest budget category, marking a 17.5% increase from 2012. Of this, €102 million supported the expansion of Line 1 trains and platforms, and €1 million was allocated to the Pass Pass ticketing system.

==== Traffic ====
In 2005, Line 2 had an average daily ridership of 174,800, making it the third most used metro line in France outside the Île-de-France region, according to the Center for the Study of Networks, Transport, Urban Planning and Public Construction (CERTU). By 2013, daily ridership was estimated at 180,000 journeys.

== Development projects ==
=== Transfer of 27 trains to Line 2 ===
Line 2 operates below its maximum capacity, with trains running every 1.5 minutes compared to a potential frequency of one train per minute, and no construction projects are currently planned. As part of upgrades to Line 1, involving the replacement of VAL 208 trainsets with Alstom Metropolis BOA-type trains, 27 VAL 208 trainsets will be transferred to Line 2 to enhance service frequency. Initially planned for 2016, this transfer has been delayed until the completion of Line 1 platform extensions and delivery of the new trains, expected no earlier than early 2026, according to a November 2023 statement by Damien Castelain, president of the European Metropolis of Lille.

=== Extension from Saint-Philibert to Pérenchies station ===
The Métropole Européenne de Lille (MEL) proposed a 1.8 km extension of Line 2 beyond the Saint-Philibert terminus to Pérenchies station during public consultations on regional transport. This extension would connect the TER Hauts-de-France regional rail lines serving the coast with the Ilévia public transport network in the western Lille metropolitan area.

== Places served ==
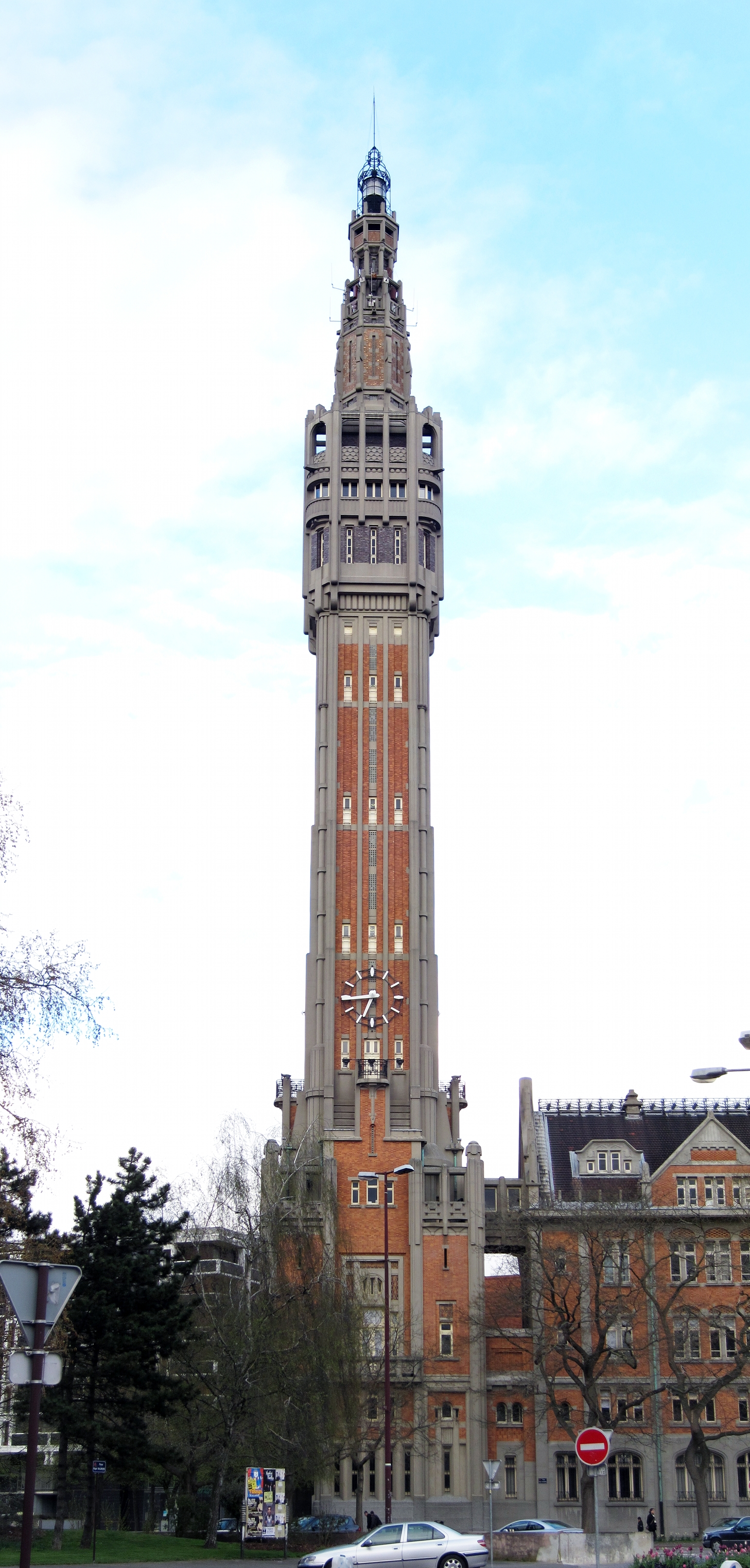
The belfry of Lille town hall, a historic monument and Unesco World Heritage Site, is served by the Mairie de Lille station.

Line 2 serves several tourist attractions, historical sites, and activity centers in the Lille metropolitan area.

The Saint-Philibert terminus provides access to the Kinepolis multiplex cinema in Lomme, the largest in France with 23 theaters, and Saint-Philibert Hospital.

In Lille, the line connects to cultural venues. Bois Blancs station is near Le Grand Bleu, a national center for artistic production and distribution. Porte d'Arras and Porte de Douai – Jardin des Plantes stations provide access to Maison Folie Moulins, a former brewery renovated for the Lille 2004 event. Lille-Saint-Sauveur railway station, located between Porte de Valenciennes and Lille Grand Palais stations, hosts cultural and leisure activities. Lille Grand Palais, near the latter station, includes a convention center, exhibition hall, and the Zénith de Lille performance venue.

In Lille, Line 2 provides access to the Institut Pasteur and the Hauts-de-France Regional Council building, both near Lille Grand Palais station. The Mairie de Lille station serves several historic monuments, including the Porte de Paris (listed in 1875), the Noble Tour (listed in 1922), the Hospice Gantois (listed in 1923 and 1967), and Lille City Hall with its belfry (listed in 2002), the latter also designated a UNESCO World Heritage Site in 2005.

Gare Lille-Flandres station connects to Lille-Flandres railway station, the Euralille shopping center, the Aéronef performance hall, the Tri Postal exhibition space, and the Porte de Roubaix, a historic monument listed in 1929. Gare Lille-Europe station, located beneath Lille-Europe railway station, provides direct access to it.

In Mons-en-Barœul, Line 2 serves Fort de Mons station, near the Fort de Mons. Constructed in the late 19th century, the fort was acquired by the city from the military in the 1970s. It was renovated in 1984 to house the Fort Socio-Cultural Center and later adapted for the Maison Folie du Fort as part of the Lille 2004 cultural event.

Line 2 serves several landmarks in Roubaix and Tourcoing. In Roubaix, Roubaix – Grand-Place station provides access to Grand-Place and City Hall, the latter listed as a historic monument in 1998. Eurotéléport station is near the Roubaix transit hub, and Gare Jean-Lebas Roubaix station serves La Piscine, a museum opened in 2001 in a former 1932 swimming pool. Alsace – Plaine Images station offers access to Le Fresnoy, a cultural complex with an art school and cinema in Tourcoing, and Plaine Images, a redeveloped industrial site in Roubaix and Tourcoing, now a creative district for the image industry, hosting companies such as Ankama and Wakanim. In Tourcoing, Tourcoing–Centre station is near Tourcoing City Hall and Saint-Christophe Church, listed as historic monuments in 1981 and 1992, respectively. The CH Dron terminus serves the Gustave-Dron Hospital Center.

== See also ==
- Lille Metro
- Line 1 (Lille Metro)
- Ilévia

== Bibliography ==
- Kühn, Francis (2001). The VAL - Lille urban community metro's experience - 1972 - 2001. Institut national de recherche sur les transports et leur sécurité.
- Houillon, Marie-Andrée; Sename, Céline (2011). Le Métro, c'est automatique [Metro, it's automatic] (in French). Villeneuve-d'Ascq: Musée du Chatêau de Flers.
- Delemarle, Sylvaine (2004). S'il te plaît, raconte moi l'histoire de Transpole: Évolution des transports publics sur l'agglomération de Lille-Roubaix-Tourcoing [Please tell me the Transpole story: Public transport developments in the Lille-Roubaix-Tourcoing conurbation] (in French). Ilévia.
- Barré, Alain (1980). Transport et aménagement urbain: l'exemple du métro dans les grandes métropoles régionales françaises [Transport and urban development: the example of the metro in major French regional cities]. Revue de géographie de Lyon (in French). Vol. 55. Association des amis de la Revue de Géographie de Lyon.
- Smet, Christian (2004). Chronique d'une activité transport dans un laboratoire de l'USTL [Chronicle of transport activity in a USTL laboratory] (PDF) (in French). ASA - USTL Publications. Archived from the original (PDF) on May 17, 2013.
- Félix, Bernard (1994). Le Val: histoire d'un nouveau moyen de transport [Le Val: the story of a new means of transport] (in French). Éditions Maxima. ISBN 2840010488.
- Guilleminot, Bernard (1981). "Le système VAL appliqué au métro de Lille" [The VAL system applied to the Lille metro]. Revue générale des chemins de fer (in French). Dunod: 273–288.
- Carlier, Pierre-Louis (1998). "Viaduc de la ligne 2 du métro de Lille" [Lille metro line 2 viaduct]. Formes et Structures (in French) (127): 66–67. ISSN 1140-5597.
