= Lille tramway =

Tram system

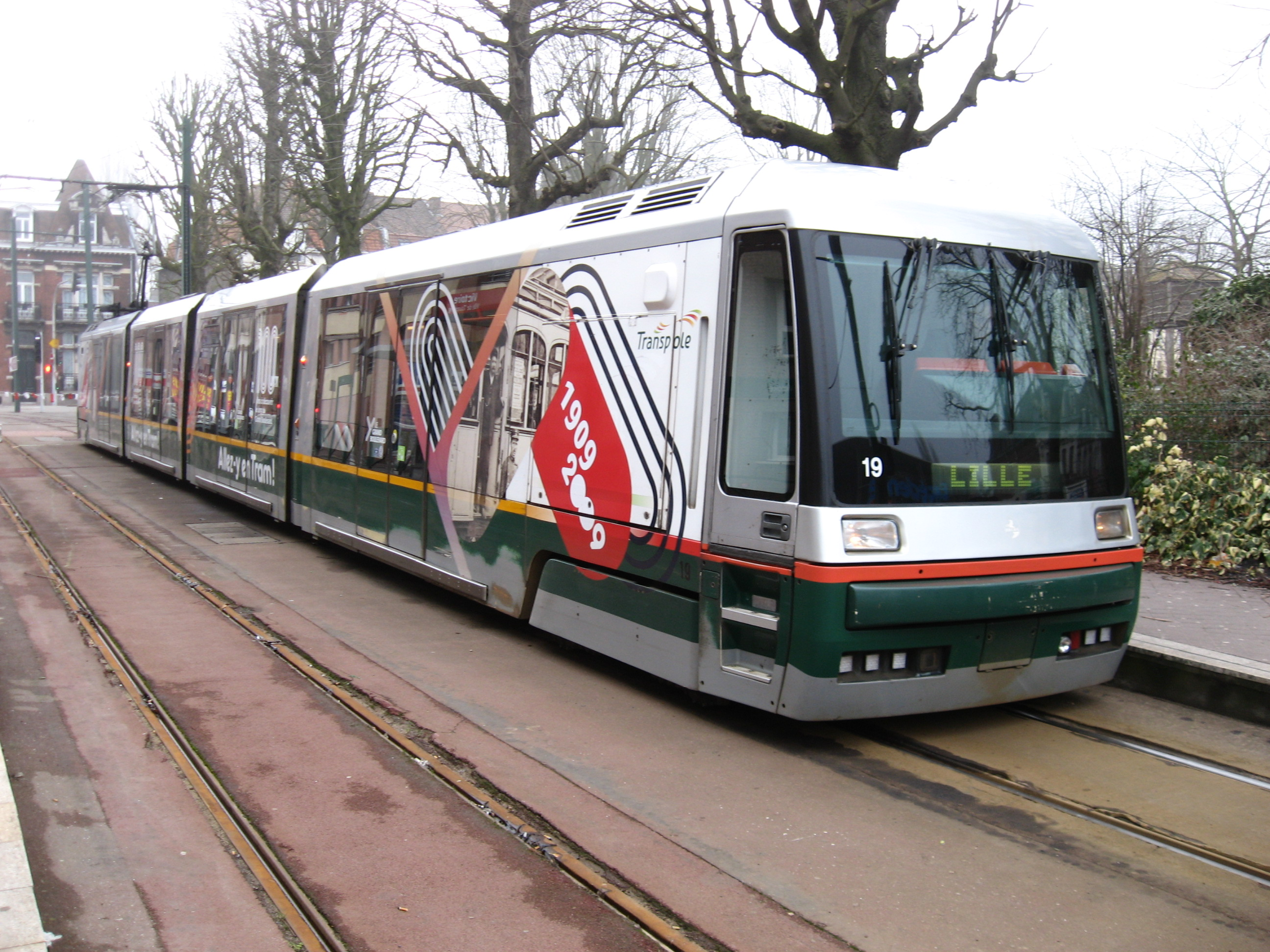

Overview
- Native name: Tramway de Lille
- Locale: Lille, Hauts-de-France, France
- Transit type: Tram
- Number of lines: 2
- Number of stations: 36

Operation
- Began operation: 1874 (horse), 1900 (electric)
- Operator: Ilevia

Technical
- System length: 17.5 km (10.9 mi)
- Track gauge: 1,000 mm (3 ft 3 3/8 in) metre gauge
- Electrification: 750 V DC
System map
Map of Lille rail transit network (metro and tram)

The Lille tramway (French: Tramway de Lille) is a public transit system in the city of Lille in Hauts-de-France, France. The tramway is often called the Mongy, after Alfred Mongy, the engineer who created the interurban lines that make up the current system. It is operated by Ilévia, the public transport operator for the Lille Métropole. Ilévia also operates the Lille Metro, a two-line underground and elevated VAL system, and 68 urban bus routes, all of which share a common ticketing system.

The system consists of two interurban lines, connecting central Lille to the nearby communities of Roubaix and Tourcoing, and has 36 stations. The lines were built at the same time as the boulevards linking Lille to its two neighbours, and the lines run on reserved track within the boulevards for most of their length.

== History ==
The first tram line in Lille was built 1874, and the electrification of the town system started in 1894. The current interurban lines were built in 1909. While most urban lines in Lille were abandoned after 1950, the Mongy remained in service as the backbone of the public transport network of the TCC, the predecessor of Transpole. Whilst the expansion of the Metro initially threatened the trams, they were kept in service. By the early 1980s, the system was one of just three French tram systems, along with those of Marseille and St. Etienne, remaining in operation – until the opening of a new system in Nantes in 1985 began a tramway revival in the country.

The lines originally terminated in the street outside the Opéra de Lille, but in 1994 were diverted into a tunnel and underground terminus at the Gare de Lille Flandres, offering interchange with both lines of the Metro. The system was renovated between 1991 and 1994, and new low-floor trams (Breda VLC) were provided. These trams have a unique configuration with single independent wheels built into the articulation. The system is metre gauge and electrified at 750 volts DC.

In 2023, 24 new Citadis trams were ordered from Alstom to replace the 1990s trams built by Breda. The order was subsequently increased to 27 trams, and the first tram was delivered in March 2026. The new five-section trams are 32.40 metres (106.3 ft) long and 2.40 metres (7 ft 10 in) wide and have an approximate capacity of 196 passengers. The bidirectional trams have four double doors on each side.

== See also ==
- Lille Metro
- Trams in France
- List of town tramway systems in France
