= Lille Metro =

Driverless light metro in Lille, France

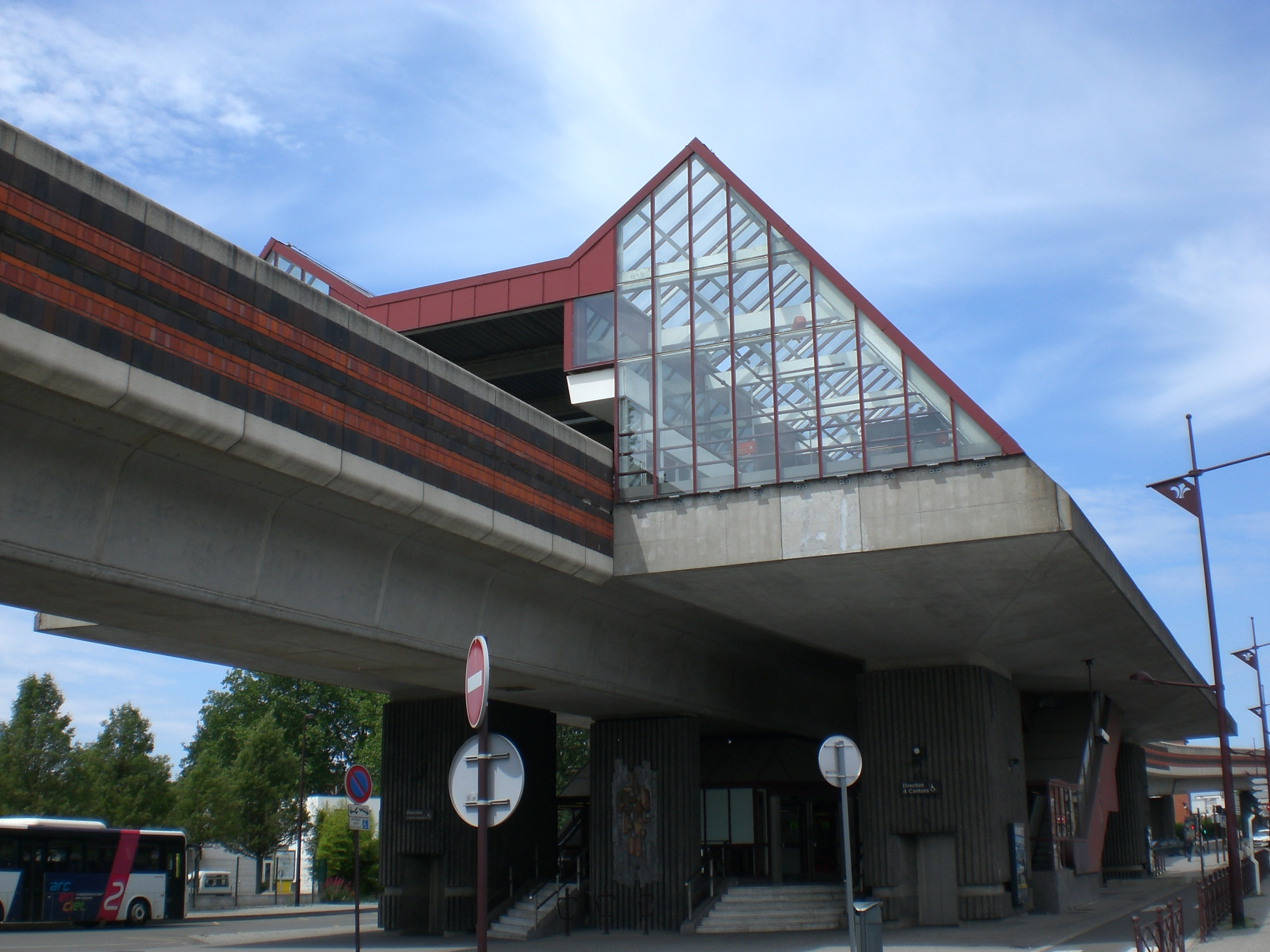
- Oscar Lambret metro station

Overview
- Native name: Métro de Lille
- Locale: Lille, France
- Transit type: Light metro
- Number of lines: 2
- Number of stations: 60
- Daily ridership: 271,230 (2011)
- Annual ridership: 99 million (2011)

Operation
- Began operation: 25 April 1983; 43 years ago
- Operator: Ilévia

Technical
- System length: 45 km (28 mi)
System map

The Lille Metro (French: Métro de Lille) is a driverless light metro system located in Lille, France. It commenced operations on 25 April 1983 and was the first system to implement the Véhicule Automatique Léger (VAL, lit. 'light automated vehicle') technology. While sometimes cited as the world’s first fully automated driverless metro, this distinction in fact belongs to the Port Island Line in Kobe, Japan, which became operational two years earlier. The Lille Metro comprises two lines, serving 60 stations across a 45-kilometre (28 mi) network. It constitutes a fundamental component of Lille's integrated public transport system, which also includes the Lille tramway and bus services, all managed under the Ilévia brand.

== History ==
In the 1960s the decentralisation of the city of Lille was considered; some towns of the Lille region were isolated and were poorly served by existing public transport, while the centre of Lille was congested with traffic and buses. The decentralisation resulted in the creation of the Public Establishment of Lille East development (EPALE) in 1968. In the 1970s, a plan for a proposed four line light metro system was developed, favouring the VAL system over conventional rail systems.

=== Construction of Line 1 ===
Construction started in 1978, and the first section was opened on 25 April 1983 between Quatre Cantons ("Four Townships") and République. On 2 May 1984 line 1 was completed, with a length of 13.5 kilometres (8.4 mi) (8.5 kilometres or 5.3 miles underground), linking CHR B-Calmette (centre hospitalier régional: "regional hospital centre") to Quatre Cantons via Gare Lille-Flandres.

=== Line 1 extension and the creation of a second line ===
While line one opened in April 1983 between Quatre Cantons and République; it was extended, with the extension from République and CHR B-Calmette opening on 2 May 1984. The cost of opening the first line in both its phases cost about 2 billion Francs.

Construction of line two began in April 1985. A depot was opened on the second line at Villeneuve-d'Ascq, after the terminus of the line Saint-Philibert in Lomme. Line one became operational in late 1988 with testing being carried out for four months. In 1989, COMELI which runs the metro merged with COTRALI, which runs the bus and tram networks into a unified public transport body.

Line 2 opened on 3 April 1989 and it connects Lille with its two large suburban towns, Roubaix and Tourcoing, reaching CH Dron (centre hospitalier: "hospital centre") near the Belgian border on 27 October 2000. It is 32 kilometres (20 mi) long with 44 stations. Both lines have platform screen doors at all stations, being the second metro to have platform doors, after the Saint Petersburg Metro.

The section between Lille and neighbouring towns of Roubaix and Tourcoing was built and opened in four stages. The first extension was inaugurated on 5 May 1994; the underground section has a length of 500 metres (1,640 ft 5 in) and connects the Euralille business area to the rest of Lille.

The third part is the longest to be opened, making about 13 km (8.1 mi). It became operational in March 1999 and commissioned on 18 August that year. This section goes through the towns of Villeneuve-d'Ascq, Wasquehal, Croix, Roubaix and stops in downtown Tourcoing. Though the route is mainly underground, the metro runs on a 1.3 km (0.81 mi) viaduct between the stations of Fort de Mons and Jean-Jaurès. The final section was inaugurated on 27 October 2000 by Prime Minister Lionel Jospin.

=== Plans for third and fourth lines ===
While a system of four lines was initially planned in the 1970s, only two lines have been built. Lille Métropole Urban Community (now called CUDL) indicates in its urban transport plan (PDU) adopted in June 2000 that 'the subway construction cost does not allow new achievements'. In 2003 a third line was estimated to cost €810 million; a cost considered prohibitive so the city explored surface networks instead; making investments in its bus and tram systems. In 2010, the vice president of urban transport, Eric Quiquet confirmed this decision by stating that the LMCU 'plans no more new metro lines' and that 'the priority is the development of the network of buses, urban tramway, the tram-train'.

== Lines ==
Line	Course	Commissioning	Length in km	Number of stations	Rolling stock	Cars per train	Oars (pointed)	Daily Journeys (2019)
Line 1	Quatre Cantons–Stade Pierre-Mauroy ↔ CHU–Eurasanté	1983	12.5	18	Val 208	2	45	184,000
Line 2	Saint-Philibert ↔ CH Dron	1989	31.1	44	Val 206	2	75	186,000

== Operations ==
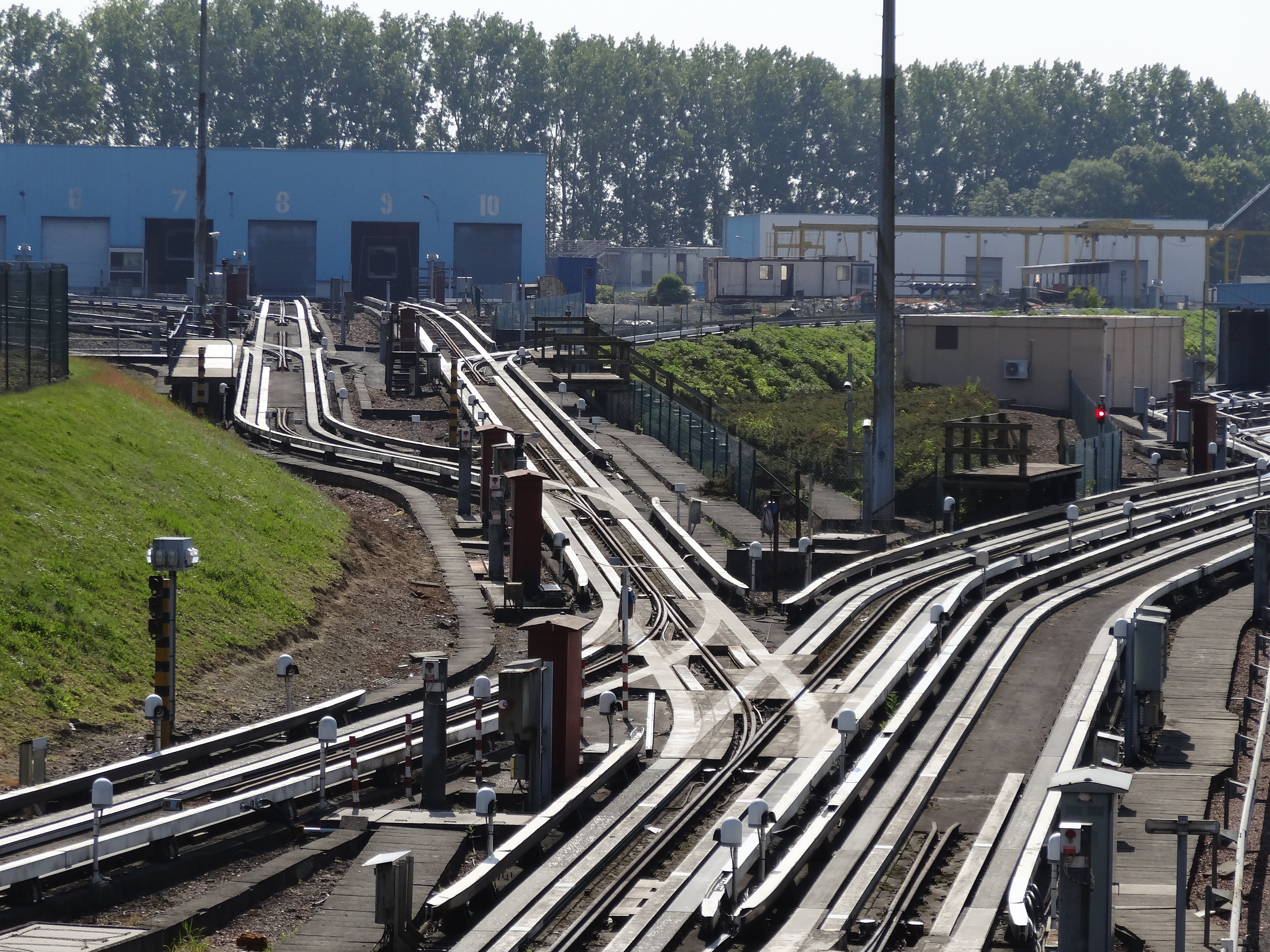
VAL tracks on the system.

Line 1 is 13.5 kilometres (8.4 mi) long (8.5 kilometres (5.3 mi) of which is underground) and serves 18 stations.

Trains are 2 metres (6 ft 6 3/4 in) wide and 26 metres (85 ft 3 5/8 in) long (composed of permanently coupled two-car sets), and are rubber-tyred. Platforms are 52 metres (170 ft 7 1/4 in) in length (though only half of the platform length is currently open to the public), long enough for two units. Each unit can carry 156 passengers.

In January 2013, work began to double the capacity of Line 1. The platforms have been lengthened to be used with new 52 metres (170 ft 7 in) long trains built by Alstom. This expansion was expected to be complete in autumn 2017, but was finally completed in February 2026, with the first 12 long trains being available for use since February 14. The former VAL 208 of the first line will then be transferred to Line 2 to increase its passenger capacity as well.

The metro operates from 5:00 a.m. until midnight, with trains every 1½ to 4 minutes (every 66 seconds during rush hour), and every 6 to 8 minutes early mornings and evenings. On Sundays there is a train every 2 to 6 minutes. A one-way ticket costs €1.80.

== Gallery ==
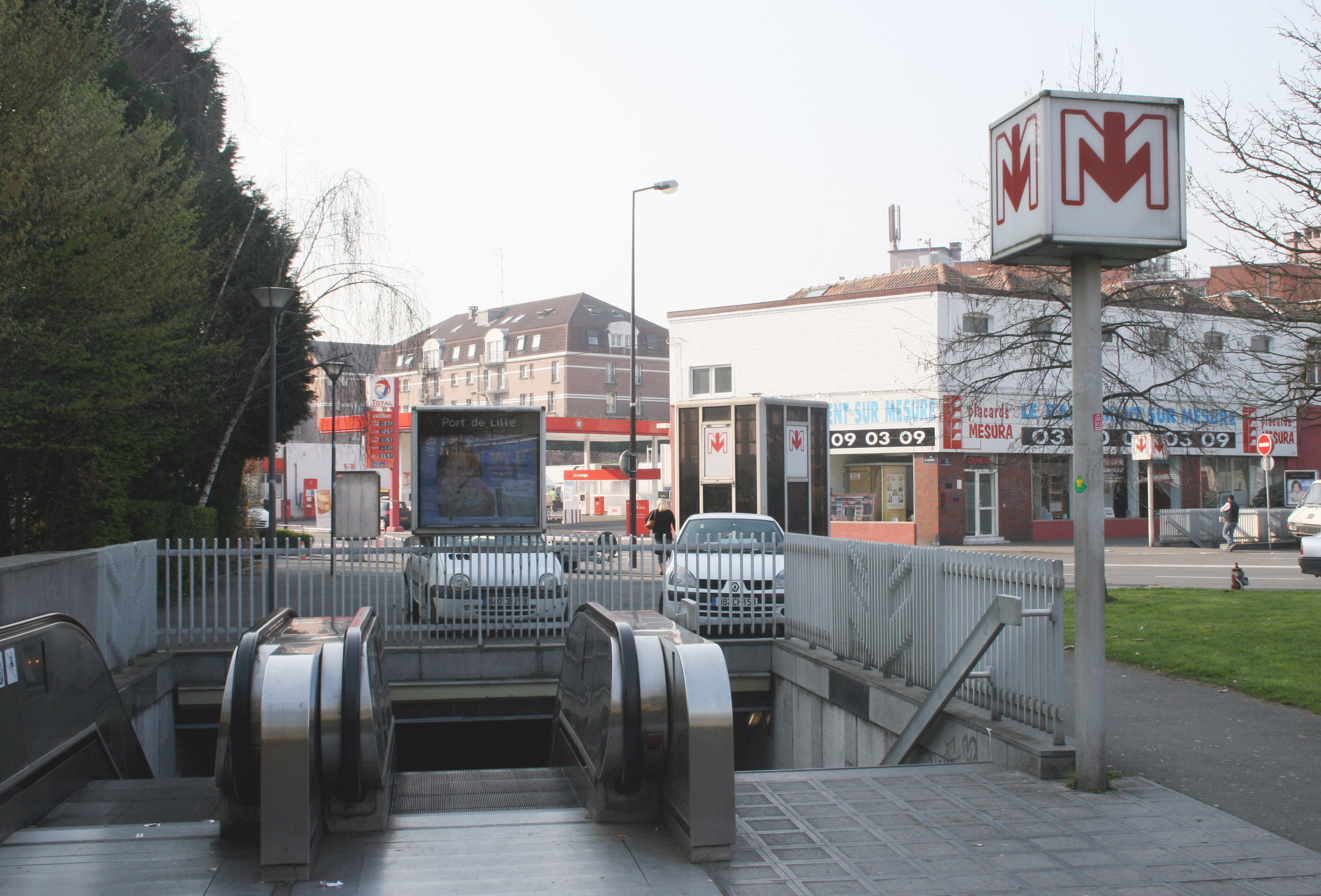
Port de Lille station.

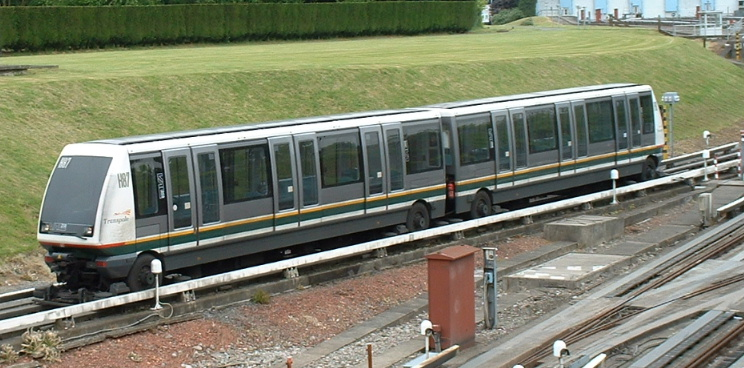
One of the 60 Siemens VAL 208 trains.

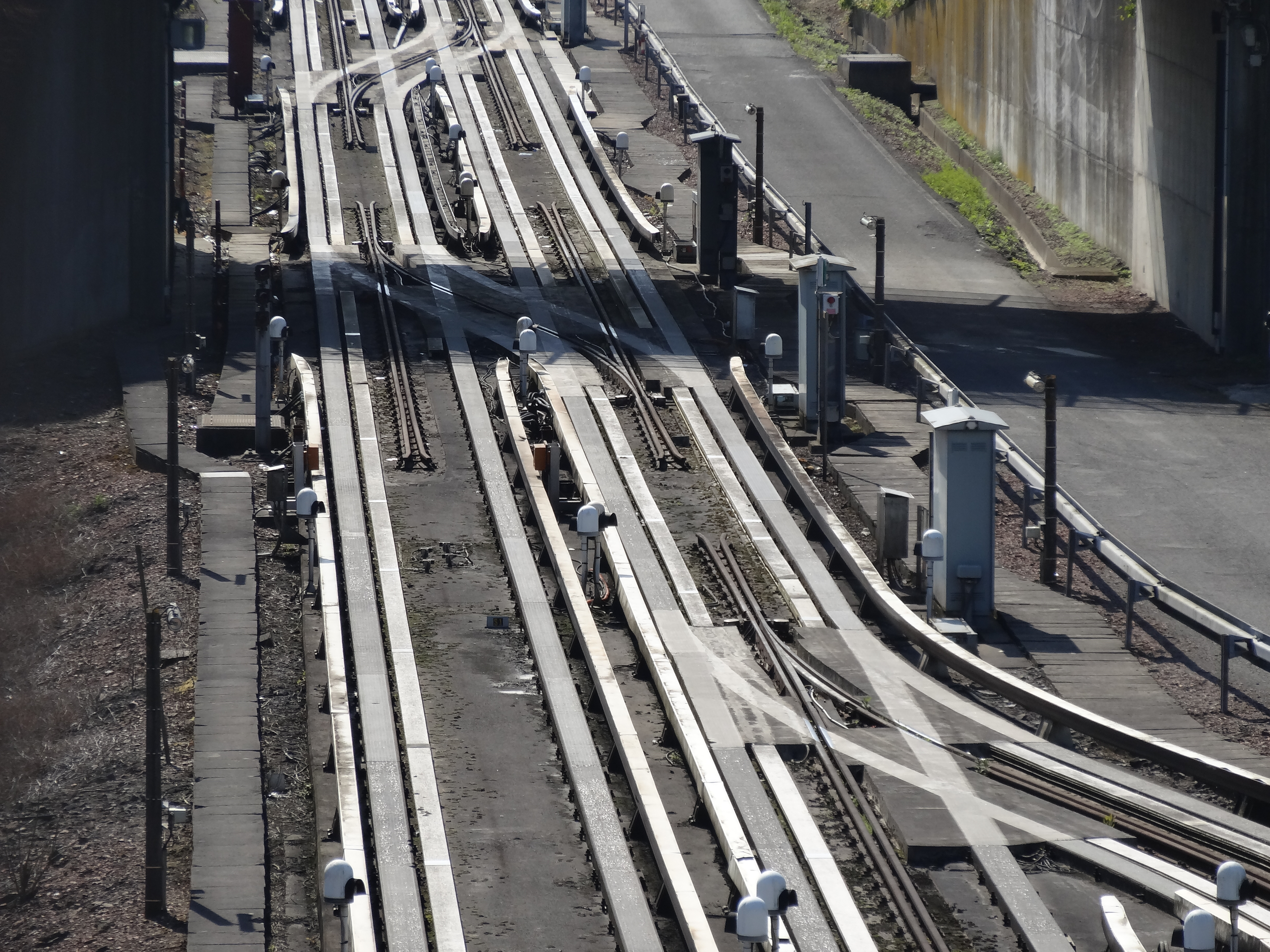
Showing rollways and switches

== See also ==
- Lille tramway
- List of metro systems
- Lille Metro Line 2
