= Saint-Christophe Church, Tourcoing =

Neo-Gothic church

Saint Christopher Church, Tourcoing
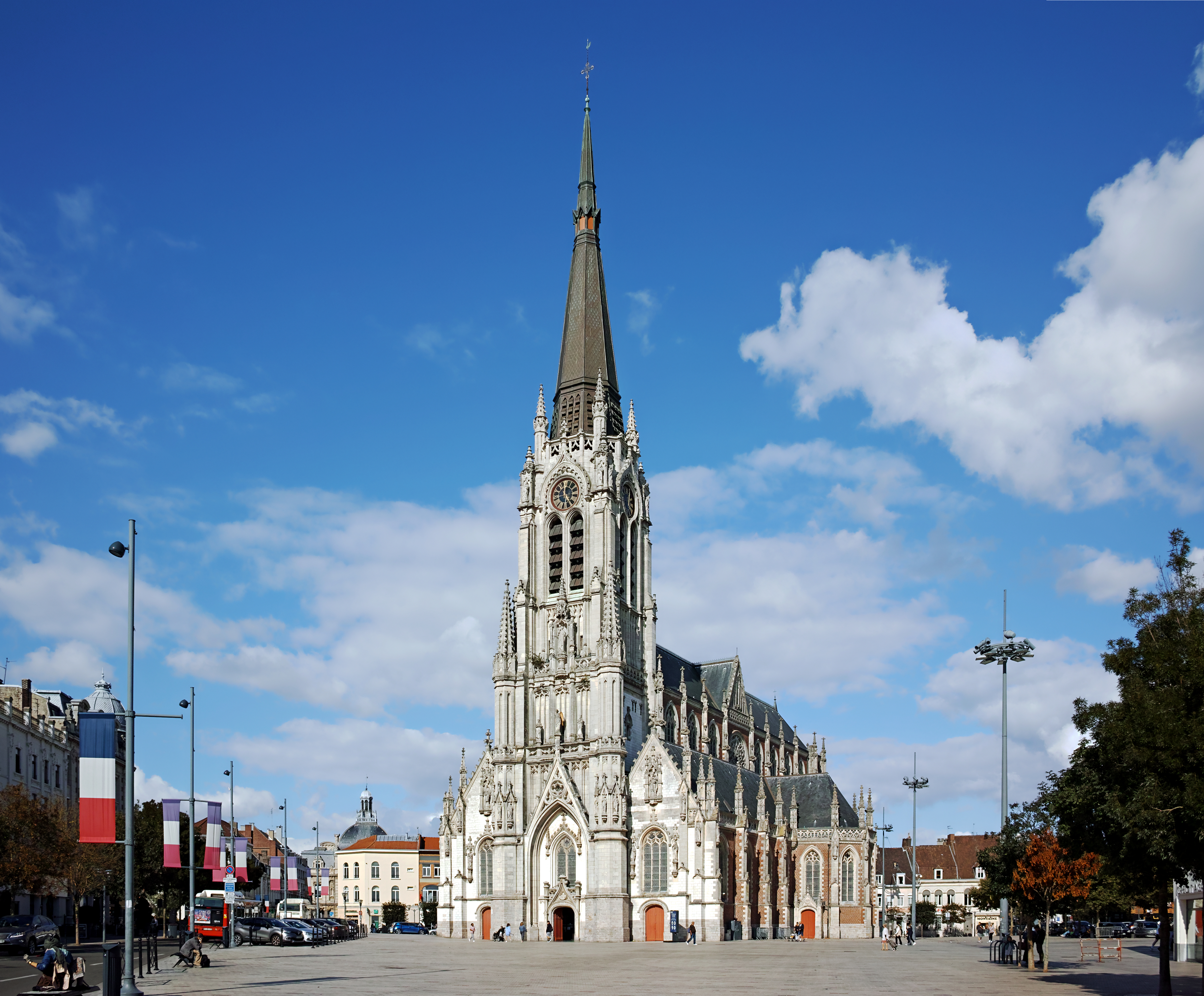

Religion
- Affiliation: Catholic Church
- Province: Nord
- Region: Hauts-de-France

Location
- Municipality: Tourcoing
- Country: France
- Interactive map of Saint Christopher Church, Tourcoing
- Coordinates: 50°43′20″N 3°09′36″E

Architecture
- Architect: Charles Leroy
- Style: Neo-Gothic
- Completed: 19th century

Saint Christopher Church is a Neo-Gothic church in Tourcoing, in the Nord department of France. Located near the town hall on the eastern side of the Grand-Place, it is dedicated to Saint Christopher and belongs to the Diocese of Lille.

== History ==
The church originated in the 11th century and was enlarged from the 12th century onward, when the initial structure was replaced by a more substantial building. A transept was added in the 13th century. In the 15th century, the bell tower, originally located at the crossing of the transept, was relocated to the porch. As Tourcoing developed economically, the church underwent successive phases of embellishment, modification, and enlargement, notably with work on the choir by Thomas-Joseph Gombert in 1722. In the 19th century, the rapid industrial and demographic growth of Tourcoing rendered the church inadequate for the size of the population. From 1846, expansion became necessary, and a major project was initiated around a decade later under the direction of the Lille architect Charles Leroy, including the raising of the central nave. The work continued over several decades, with further interventions by Charles Maillard and Louis Croïn in 1897; Croïn enlarged and heightened the bell tower while preserving its 18th-century roof structure. Elements preserved from earlier phases include the 13th-century porch, the brick walls of the choir aisles, and the 16th-century columns. The clerestory stained-glass windows and rose windows date from 1878, while those in the aisles were produced between 1891 and 1898.

After an extended period of closure for restoration, the church was reopened for worship in 2001, with restoration work completed in 2011.

In 1998, the building hosted a concert by the group Crick-Sicks in connection with its reopening.

== Description ==
The church façade, built entirely of stone, is inspired by Rayonnant Gothic architecture combined with Flamboyant elements, particularly visible in the tracery. Symmetrical in composition, it is divided into three bays corresponding to the interior layout: the bell tower aligns with the nave, while the two smaller lateral façades correspond to the aisles. The portal is set within an arcade surmounted by an openwork gable. It consists of a doorway topped by an ogee arch and an openwork balustrade. The portal is separated from the lateral façades by two buttresses crowned with pinnacles. The bell tower rises to a height of approximately 80 meters. Its surfaces are articulated by blind arcades with Flamboyant tracery, which serve a decorative rather than a structural function. The upper part of the bell tower, completed by Louis Croïn between 1895 and 1898, is pierced by two lancet windows surmounted by a clock framed by an ogee arch. This level houses the carillon, composed of 62 bells, which has been present since the 17th century. At the corners of the tower, buttresses topped with turrets and pinnacles accentuate the vertical emphasis of the structure. The bell tower is crowned by a slate-covered spire. The lateral façades are pierced by bays composed of three lancets and terminate in gables decorated with leaf crockets and a finial. Along their sides, buttresses crowned with pinnacles provide continuity with the architectural treatment of the rest of the building.

The church is 60 meters long, and its bell tower reaches a height of 80 meters. A spiral staircase of 255 steps leads to a carillon museum devoted to bell-making, including the manufacture and functions of bells. From there, visitors reach the 62 bells and the clock via a 16th-century staircase, which also provides a panoramic view over the metropolitan area. The carillon includes a bourdon bell weighing six tons.

The interior is bright. The 19th-century keystones are painted red and green and form part of a polychrome decorative scheme from the same period, which originally covered the entire elevation.

== Furnishings ==
The church contains finely crafted confessionals decorated with carved wooden statuettes, dating from 1730.

The grand organ, completed in 1751, was built by Fremat and Carlier for the instrumental components, with the case made by Labre father and son. It subsequently underwent several modifications and restorations during the 19th century, notably by Van Peteghem, Loret, Joseph Merklin, and Neuville, before a major restoration carried out on the eve of the First World War by the Delmotte firm of Tournai, during which the rear Positive division was removed.

After a mechanical overhaul in 1951, the organ was restored again in 1969–1970 by Meyer and Daniellot, following restoration work on the church.

== Gallery ==
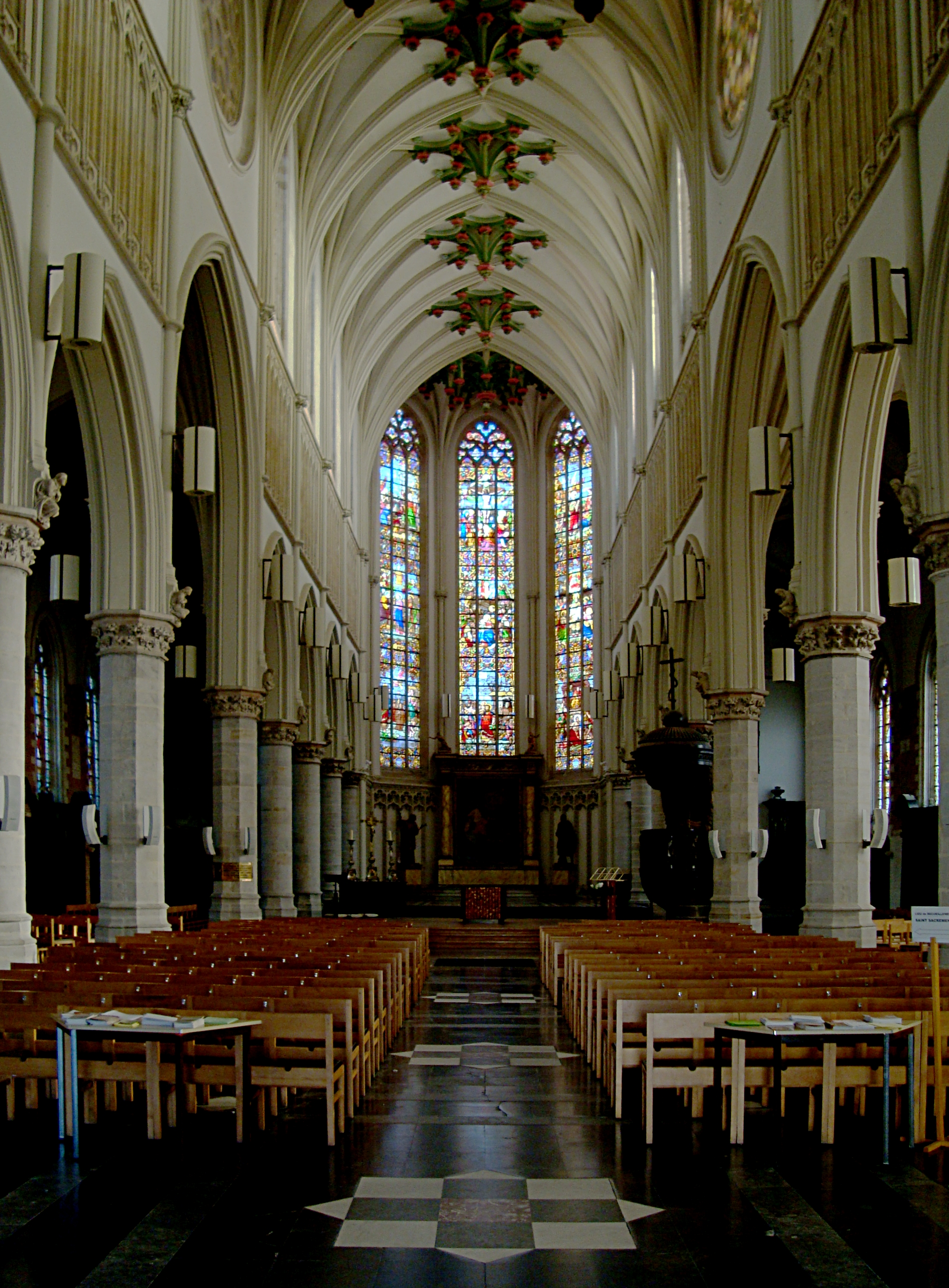
Nave

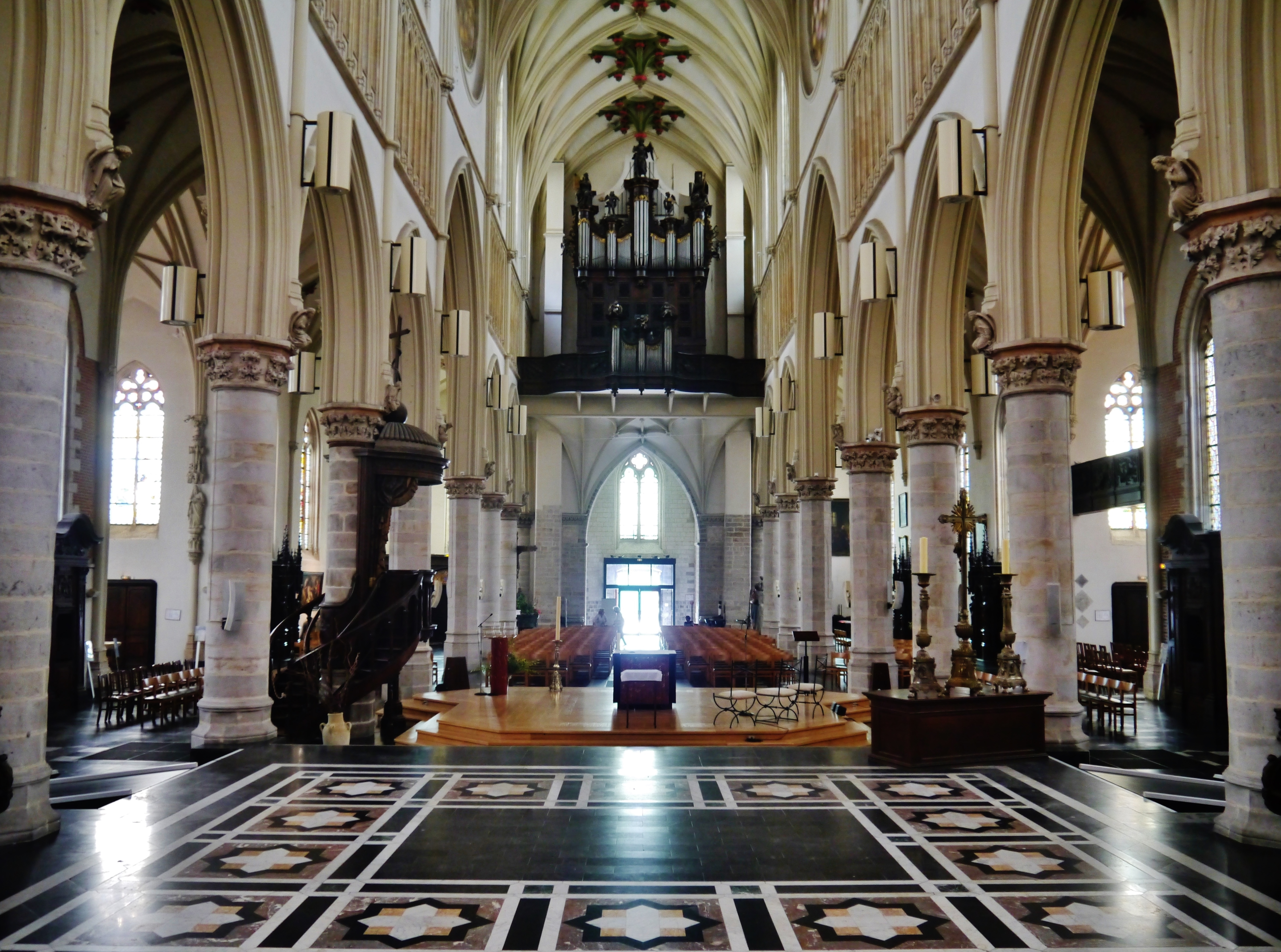
Nave seen from the choir

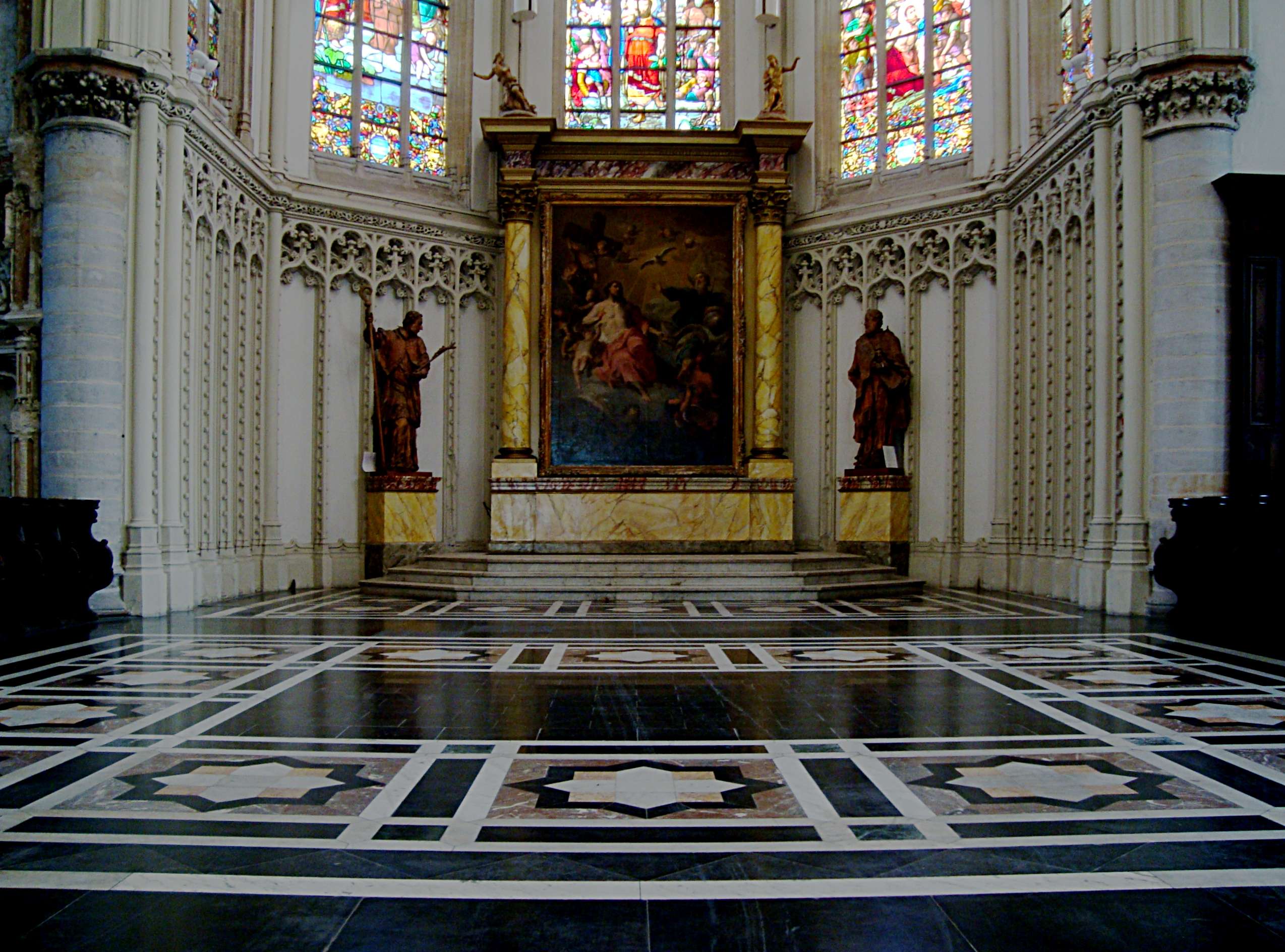
The choir

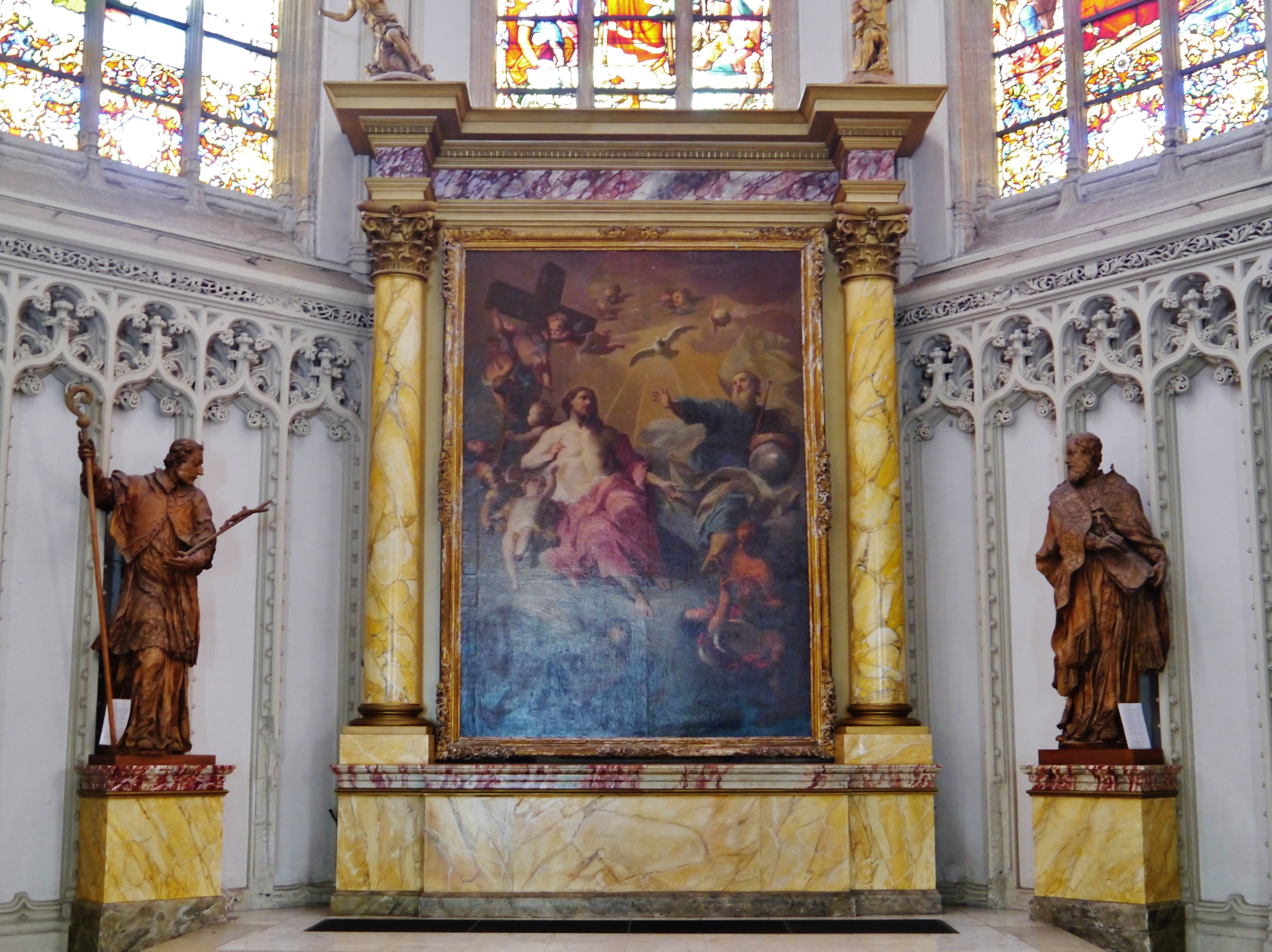
Remains of the high altar: altarpiece and statues

== See also ==
- Tourcoing
- Gothic Revival architecture
- Archdiocese of Lille
