= Alfred Mongy =

French engineer (1840–1914)

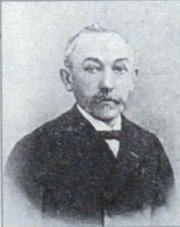
Alfred Mongy

Alfred Mongy (1840–1914) was a French engineer. He was born on March 21, 1840, in Lille, and died June 30, 1914. He was actively involved in the development of Lille, particularly in the field of urban transport.

== Biography ==
Alfred Mongy was born March 21, 1840, at Lille in the neighborhood of Treille in Old Lille. Coming from a modest family but being a brilliant student, he entered the municipal services in his hometown aged 20 years in 1860 with the vision of a grand boulevard that would allow urban sprawl outside the ramparts of Lille. The mayor of Lille at the time, Augustus Richebé refused to support the project. He directed the construction of many public buildings (schools, institutes, university buildings), and the restoration of the Porte de Paris.

Mongy left the municipal services in 1896 and began an independent engineer after four years at the prefectural services.

With Arthur Stoclet he pioneered a great project: the breakthrough Grand Boulevard between Lille, Roubaix and Tourcoing. Alfred Mongy is one of the founders in 1900 of the Tramways Company and Northern Railways, which implements the construction of the Grand Boulevard Lille-Roubaix-Tourcoing. The project opened on December 5, 1909, with a Boulevard 50 m wide. This boulevard consisted of two lanes, designed by engineer Leo Francq. An electric tram ran along the boulevard that quickly became nicknamed "Mongy." Many changes have been made but two lines of Mongy still exist now with some updates to critical underground passages.
