= Bois-Blancs =

Bois Blancs
- District
- Interactive map of Bois Blancs
- Country: France
- Region: Hauts-de-France
- Department: Nord
- City: Lille

Bois-Blancs is a residential area located west of Lille, France.

== History ==
=== The development of an industrial district ===
Its development dates back to the late 19th and early 20th centuries, notably with the establishment in 1876 of a Le Blan factory, followed around 1920 by the company's subsidiary, the "Cotonnière lilloise," located between Avenue de Bretagne and the canal, and the construction of the electricity and gas plant in the north. A residential area, mainly workers' housing, was established between the Quai de l'Ouest (the name given to the towpath in 1876) and the Rue des Bois Blancs, which led to the construction of the Saint-Charles church in 1906, completed by the bell tower in 1933.

== See also ==
- HQE
- Ecodistrict
