= Vauban-Esquermes =

- District
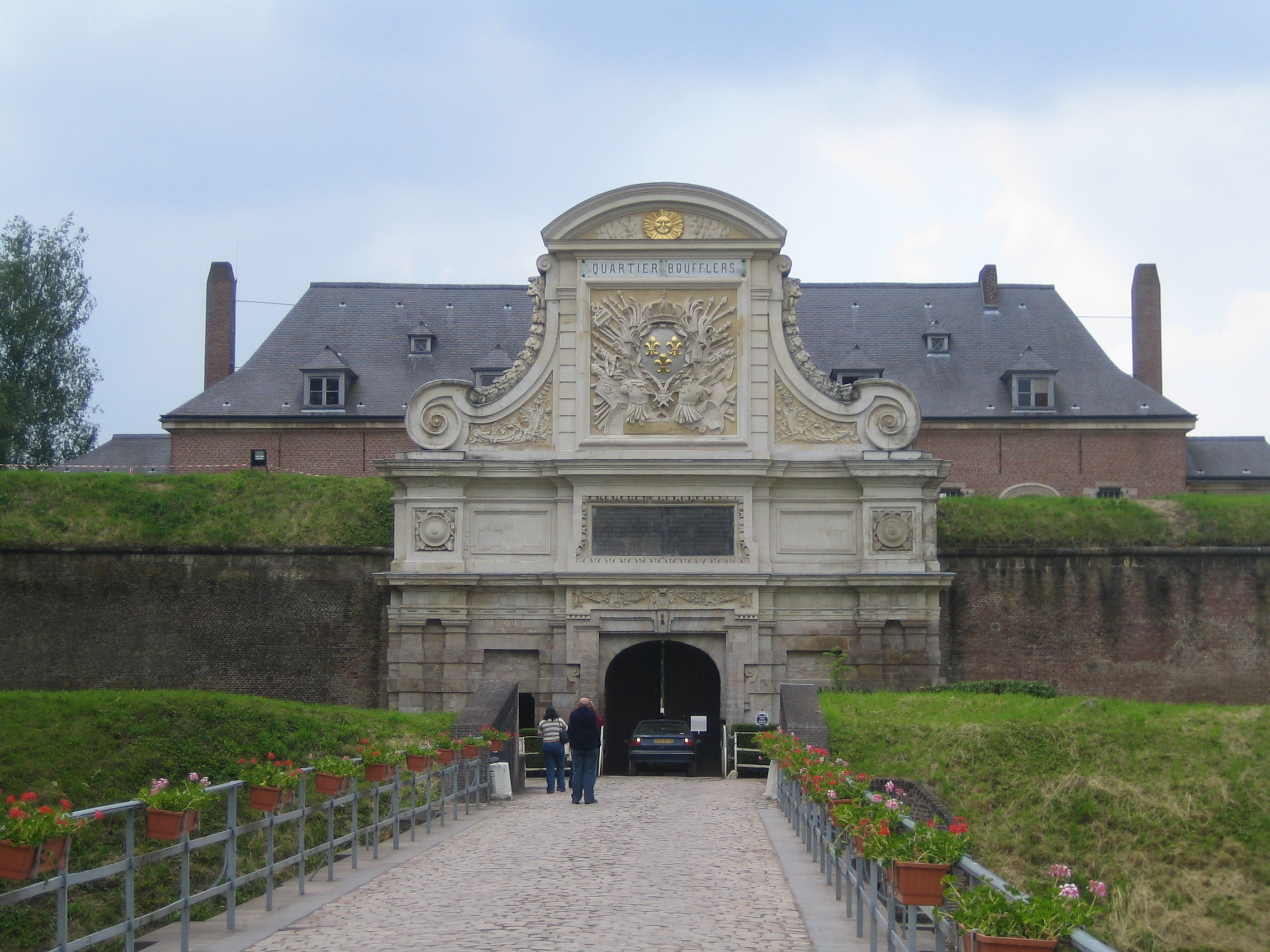
- The royal gate of the Vauban citadel of Lille
- Interactive map of Vauban-Esquermes
- Coordinates: 50.6306°N 3.0406°E
- Country: France
- Region: Hauts-de-France
- Department: Nord
- Arrondissement: Lille
- City: Lille

Vauban-Esquermes [vobɑ̃ ekɛʁm] is a district located west of Lille, which is residential and traditionally student-oriented.

It notably houses the citadel, the Bois de Boulogne, the Vauban garden, the Lille Zoo, the P'tit Jacques, the Palais Rameau and the Vauban campus of the city's Catholic university, as well as numerous private high schools and higher education institutions. This 200-hectare district (50 hectares of which are green spaces) has experienced population growth since 1990 and had 18,315 inhabitants in 2010.

== History ==
=== The suburb of La Barre and the territory of the future Vauban district ===
Its population, approximately 600 inhabitants in 1783 (150 houses), rose to 1,012 inhabitants in 1806, 1,425 in 1831, and 2,858 in 1851.

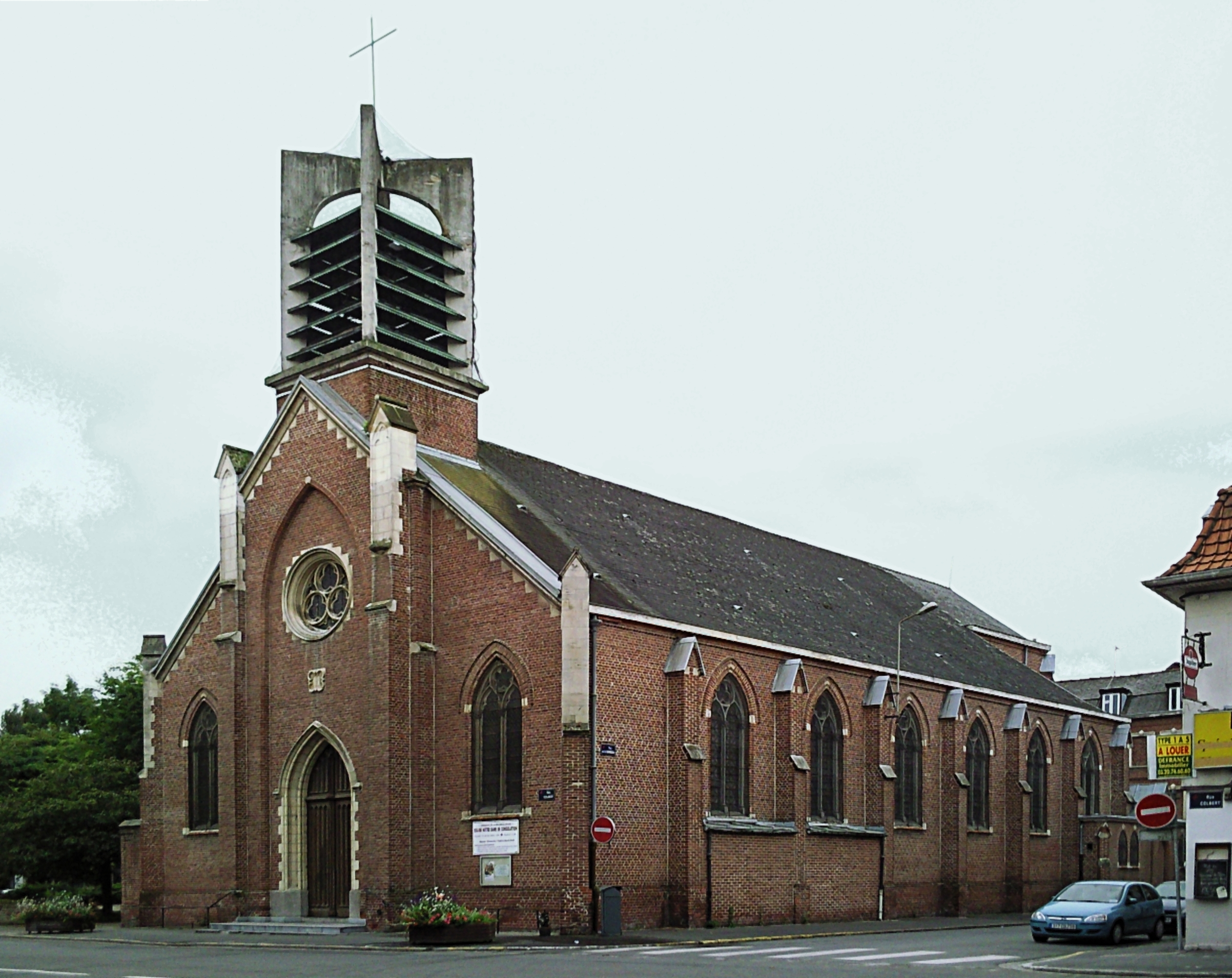
Church of Our Lady of Consolation

The development of the Vauban port begun in 1854, shortly before the annexation of Wazemmes, was carried out by the city of Lille from 1862 onwards.

This sanitation process was quite slow: the Vauban canal was only covered in 1876, and the station canal in 1883. In 1909, the old bed of the Fourchon between Place du Général-Leclerc and Rue Colson was still only partially filled in.

The urbanization of this area was very gradual. In 1881, the Place de Tourcoing (now Place du Maréchal-Leclerc) was bordered by only one building.

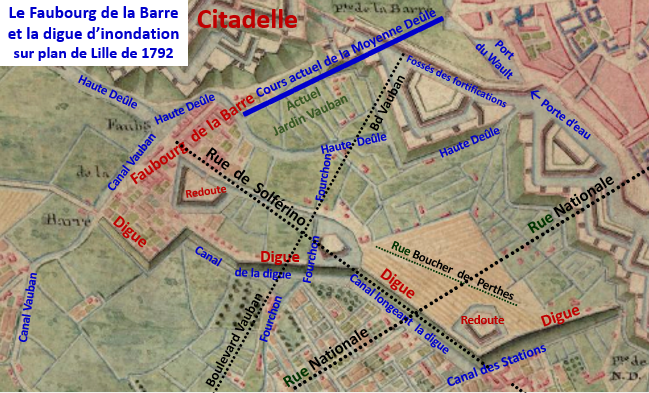
The dike and the suburb of La Barre in 1792.

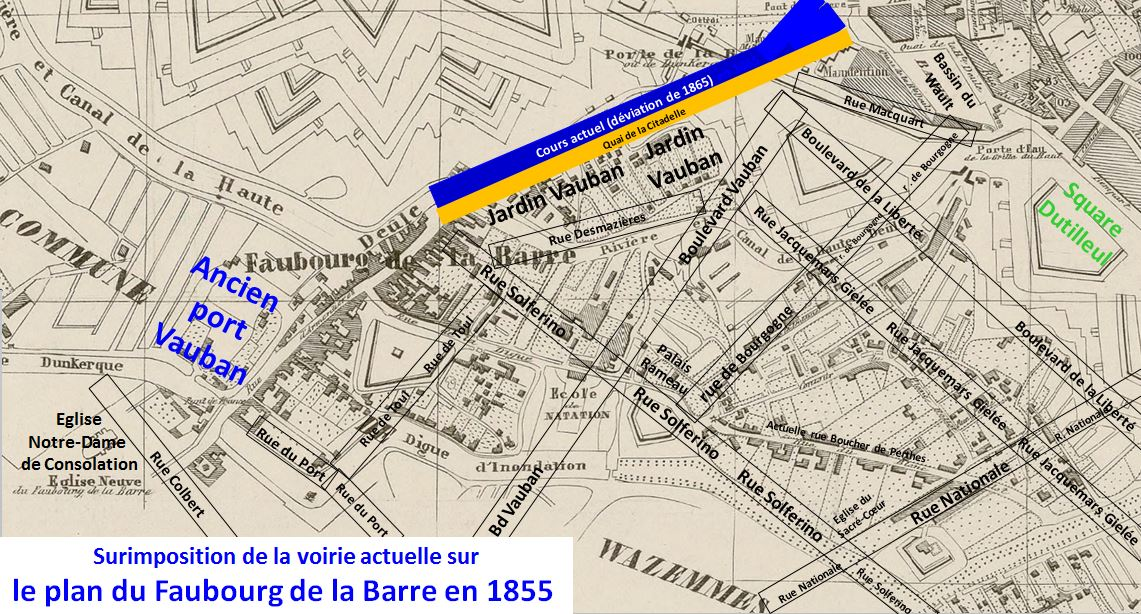
Faubourg de la Barre in 1855 with superimposition of the current main roads and of the Deûle after 1865.

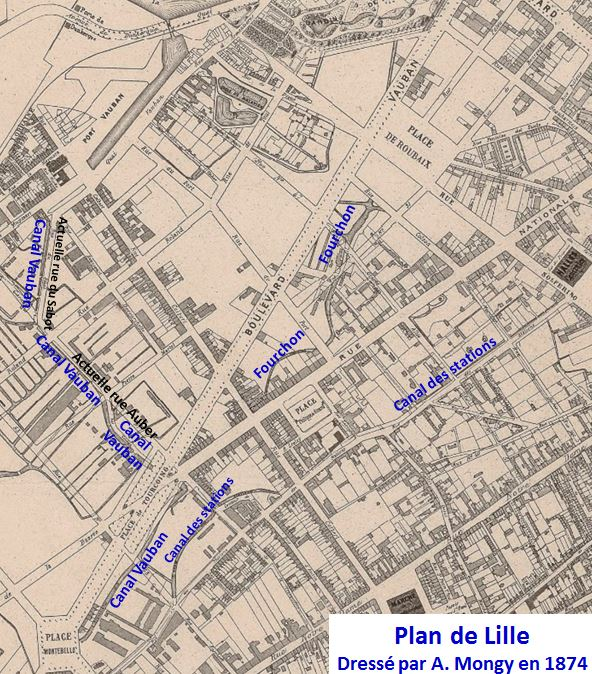
Map of Wazemmes-Vauban in 1874 (extract from the map of Lille established by Alfred Mongy).

== Vauban-Esquermes in the 21st century ==
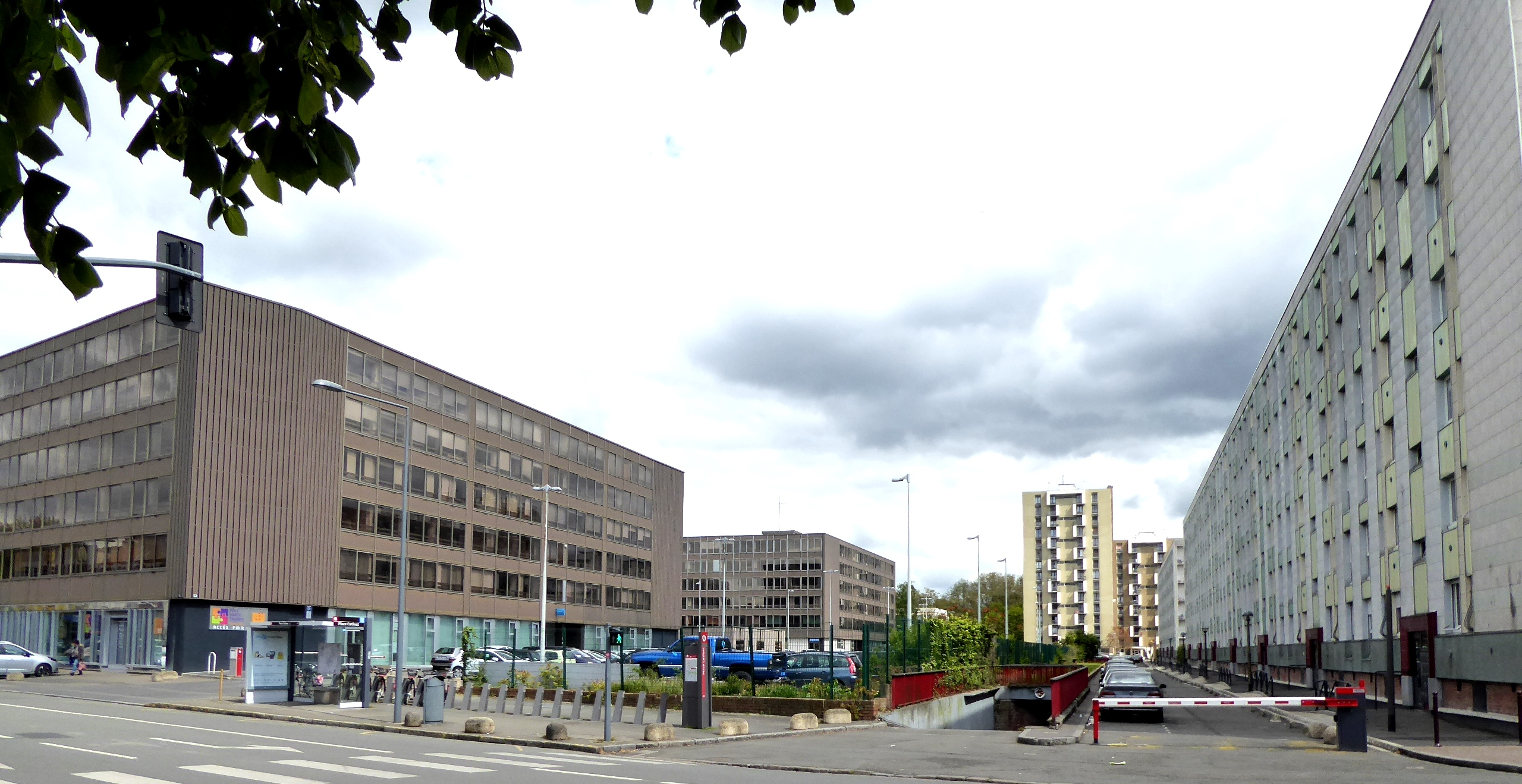
The former Port Vauban in 2017

Some former private mansions have been replaced by apartment buildings, but the district retains an interesting architectural heritage of various styles from 1860 to 1940.
