= Ilévia =

Map of Lille's metro and tramway lines

Ilévia is the public transport operator for the Lille Métropole, the metropolitan area surrounding the city of Lille in northern France. It operates a mixed system, comprising buses, trams and a driverless light metro system. The company is a subsidiary of Keolis, the largest private sector French transport group. Keolis is itself 70% owned by SNCF and 30% owned by Caisse de dépôt et placement du Québec. In January 2019, the company changed from its former name 'Transpole' to 'ilévia'.

== Metro ==
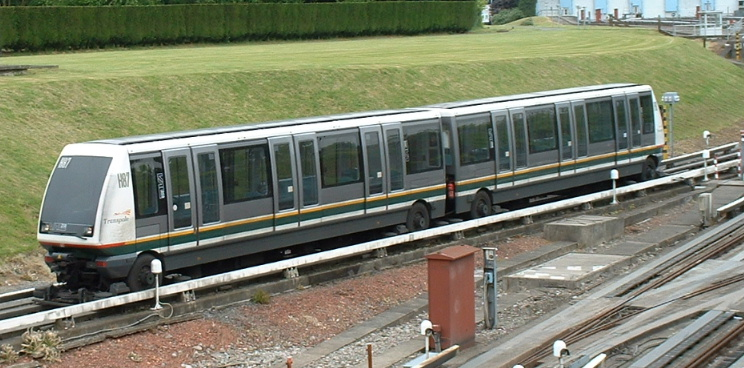
A train of type Val-208 on the Lille Metro

The Lille Metro is a VAL system (véhicule automatique léger = light automated vehicle), which opened on May 16, 1983, the first automatic metro line in the world. It has two lines, with a total length of 45 km (28 mi), and 60 stations. All stations have doors between the platform and the train.

Line 1 is 13.5 km (8.4 mi) long, of which 8.5 km (5.3 mi) are underground, with 18 stations. The line links Loos, to the south-west of Lille, with Villeneuve d'Ascq, to the south-east, via central Lille and the Gare de Lille-Flandres. Line 2 is 32 km (20 mi) long with 43 stations. It links Lomme, to the west of Lille, to the Belgian border, via central Lille, the Gare de Lille-Flandres, Roubaix and Tourcoing.

== Tramway ==
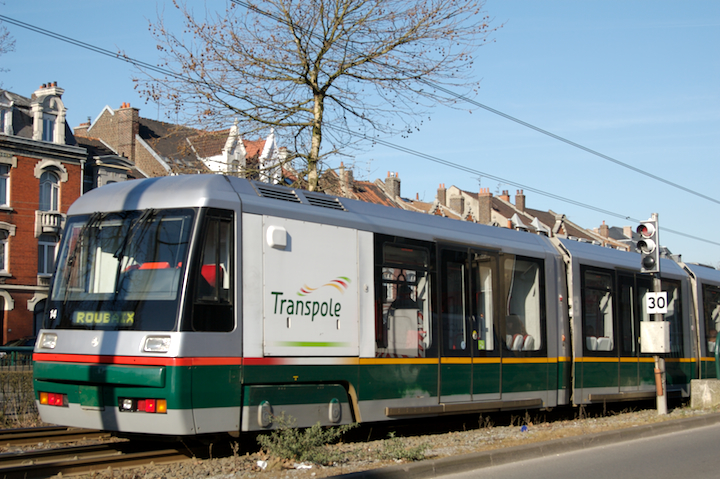
One of the tram cars, at Marcq-en-Baroeul on the Roubaix line

The tram system consists of two interurban tram lines, connecting central Lille to the nearby communities of Roubaix and Tourcoing, and has 45 stops. It is metre gauge electrified at 750 volts DC. The system is often called the Mongy, after Alfred Mongy, the engineer who created it. It was built in 1909 at the same time as the boulevards linking Lille to its two neighbours, and the lines run on reserved track within the boulevards for most of their length.

While most urban lines in Lille were abandoned after 1950, the Mongy remained in service as the backbone of the public transport network of the TCC, the predecessor of Ilévia. Whilst the expansion of the Metro initially threatened the trams, they were kept in service. The system was renovated between 1991 and 1994, and new low-floor trams were provided.

== Buses ==
Ilévia also operates 68 urban bus routes, eight of which run into Belgium.
