= VAL 208 =

Rapid transit rolling stock

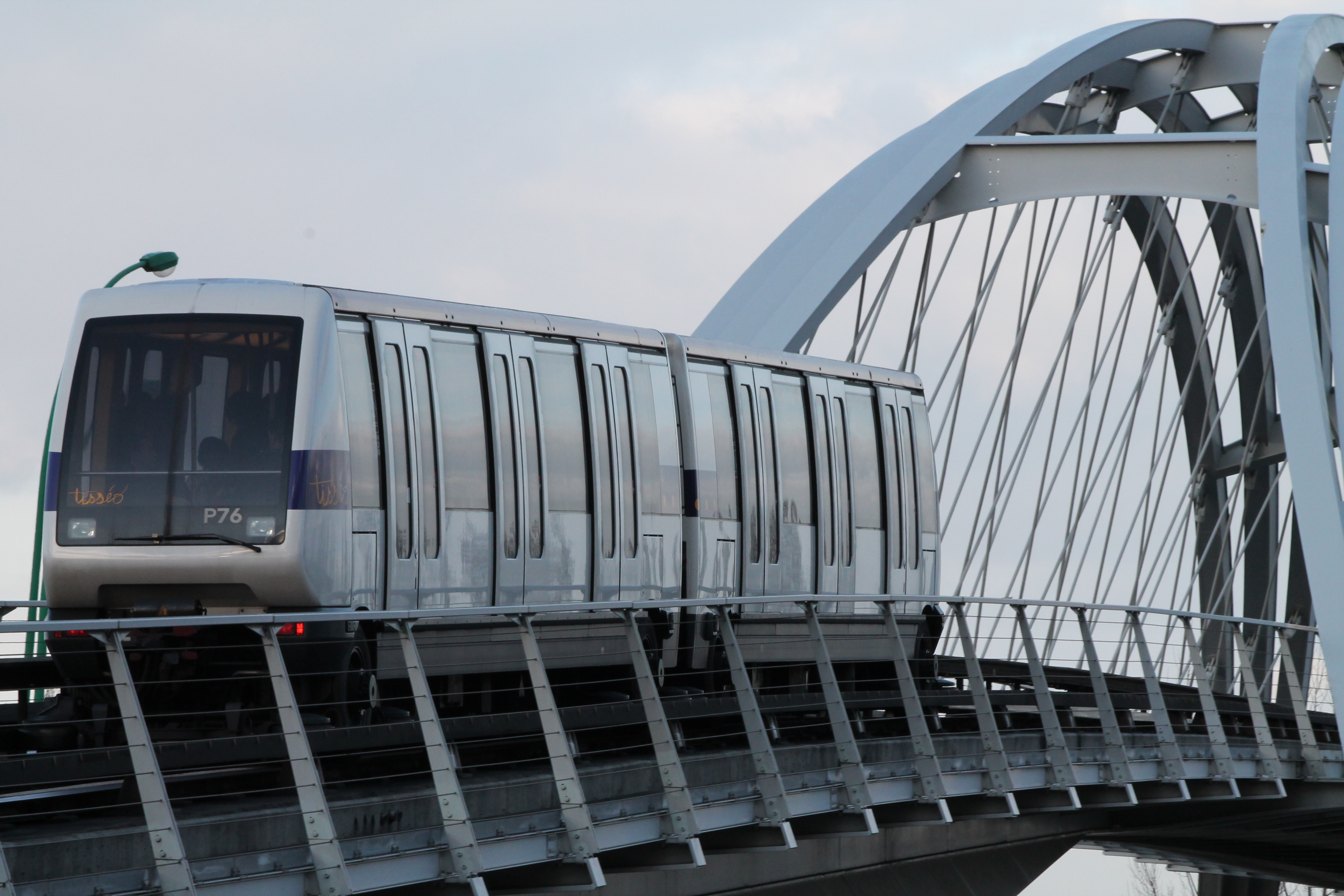
- VAL 208 train on the Toulouse viaduct
- In service: 2001–present
- Manufacturers: Siemens Mobility, Simmering-Graz-Pauker
- Built at: Vienna, Austria
- Family name: Véhicule Automatique Léger
- Formation: 2 cars per trainset

Specifications
- Car body construction: Aluminium alloy
- Car length: 13.07 m (42 ft 10 5/8 in)
- Width: 2.08 m (6 ft 9 7/8 in)
- Height: 3.27 m (10 ft 8 3/4 in)(without air conditioning); 3.7 m (12 ft 1 5/8 in)(with air conditioning)
- Doors: 3 per side
- Maximum speed: 80 km/h (50 mph)
- Traction motors: 8 × MTS-14 65 kW (87 hp) brushless DC synchronous motor
- Power output: 520 kW (700 hp)
- Transmission: Parallel Cardan drive
- Acceleration: 1.3 m/s^{2} (4.3 ft/s^{2})
- Deceleration: 1.3 m/s^{2} (4.3 ft/s^{2})
- Power supply: 750 V DC third rail
- Bogies: SF-VAL208
- Safety system: ATC (ATO)
- Track gauge: 1,620 mm (5 ft 4 in)

The VAL 208 is one of the VAL series, an automated guideway transit system developed by Matra and Siemens. The vehicles are manufactured at Siemens SGP (Simmering-Graz-Pauker) in Vienna, Austria.

It has been adopted by multiple railway operators since 2000.

The number 208 in the name comes from the fact that the width of the vehicle is 208 cm (6 ft 9 7/8 in).

In the successor to VAL 206, the system is compatible with VAL 206. Normally, automatic operation is performed, but it is possible for the driver to manually operate as necessary.

== Overview ==
Because of automatic operation, the delay is small, the train density can be increased. On the other hand, since this train is basically a two-car train, it is suitable for low-population areas and medium-sized cities.

=== Interior ===
Although the vehicle is small, the window is large, so it is a car with open feeling. Due to the relatively cooler and less humid climate of Europe, air conditioning is not included in the basic specification, but is installed only on the Uijeongbu Light Rail Transit rolling stock in South Korea.

Plastics are widely used for many parts, but doors and handrail are made of stainless steel.

The color tone inside the car varies depending on the railway operator.

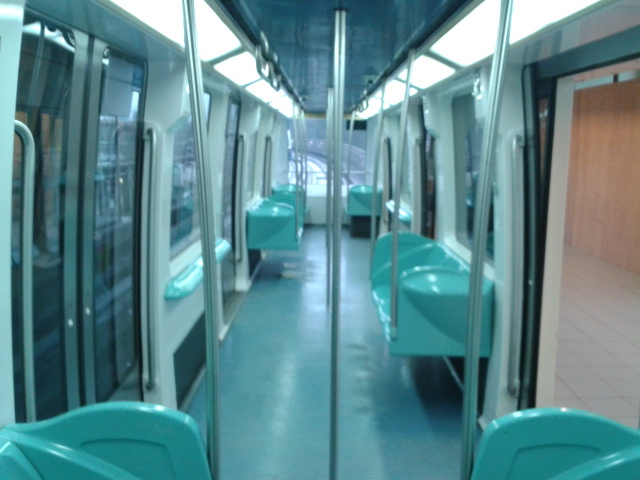
Interior (at Lille Metro)

=== Traction equipments ===
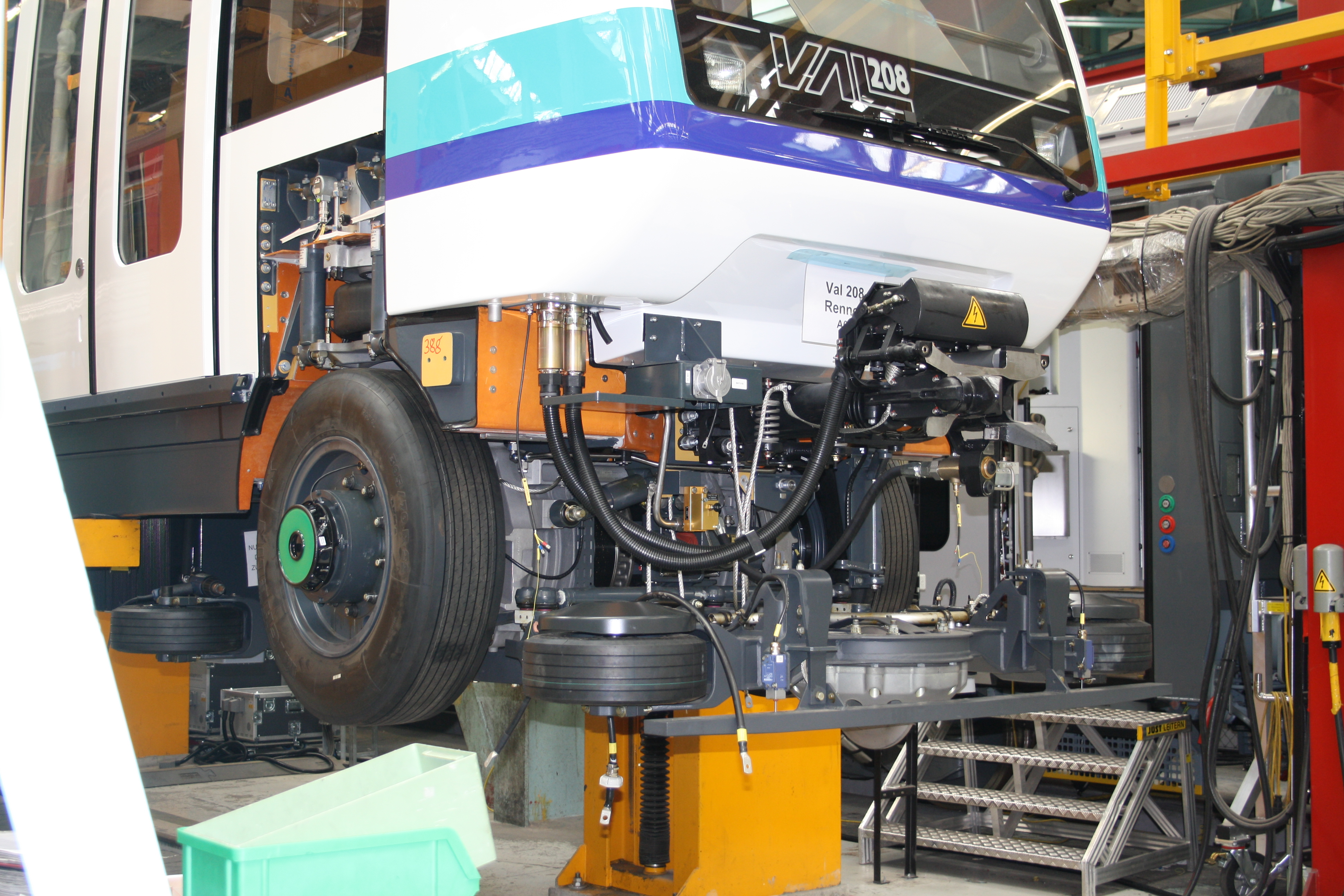
Bogie

The traction control system equips Low-voltage IGBT Chopper control.

The traction motor adopted Alstom's brushless DC motor. The traction motor was self-ventilated, mounted on bogie. It is mounted inside each wheel, and the power from the traction motor is transmitted via the planetary gear and the Cardan joint mechanism.

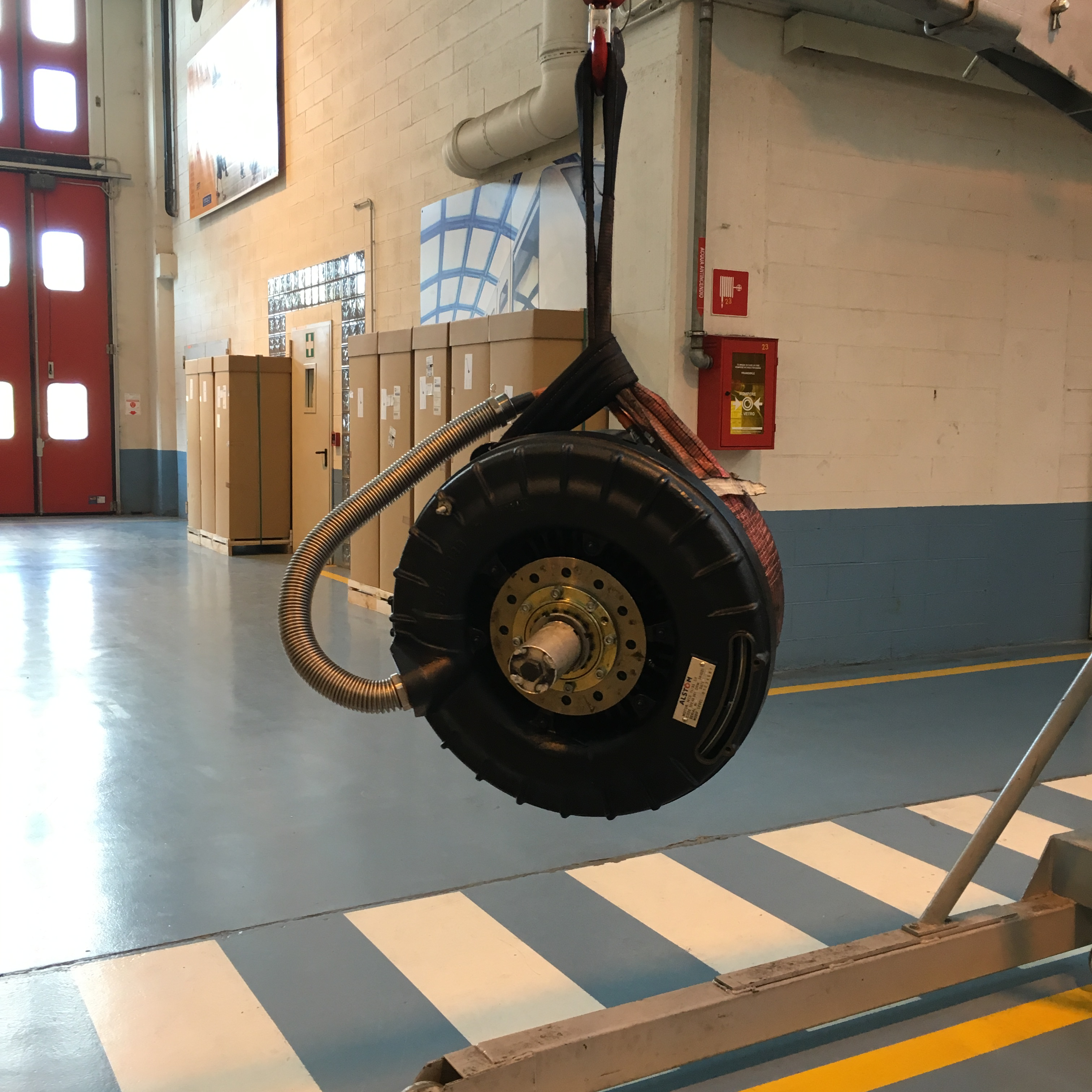
Traction motor

== VAL208NG ==
A minor change has been done several times in VAL 208, and a major change in specification was made in VAL 208 NG which is a minor change car in 2006. Specific changes are as follows.

- Abolition of VAL 208 logo
- Abolition of the Matra logo that was on the door
- Reduction of noise by reviewing traction motor specifications
- Change of structure of the door
- Weight saving

== Use of the VAL208 ==
| Country | Locality | Operator | Type | Remarks |
|---|---|---|---|---|
| France | Paris (Charles de Gaulle Airport) | Paris-Charles de Gaulle Airport (CDGVAL) | VAL208NG VAL208NG2 VAL208NG3 | |
| France | Lille | Transpole (Lille Metro) | VAL208 VAL208NG3 | |
| France | Rennes | STAR (Rennes Metro) | VAL208 VAL208NG VAL208NG2 VAL208NG3 | |
| France | Toulouse | Tisséo (Toulouse Metro) | VAL208 VAL208NG VAL208NG2 VAL208NG3 | |
| Italy | Turin | GTT (Turin Metro) | VAL208 VAL208NG VAL208NG3 | |
| South Korea | Uijeongbu | Uijeongbu Light Rail Transit (U Line) | VAL208NG2 | The only air conditioned |
