= Indian locomotive class WAG D-9 =

Indian Railway freight class electric locomotive

WAG D-9
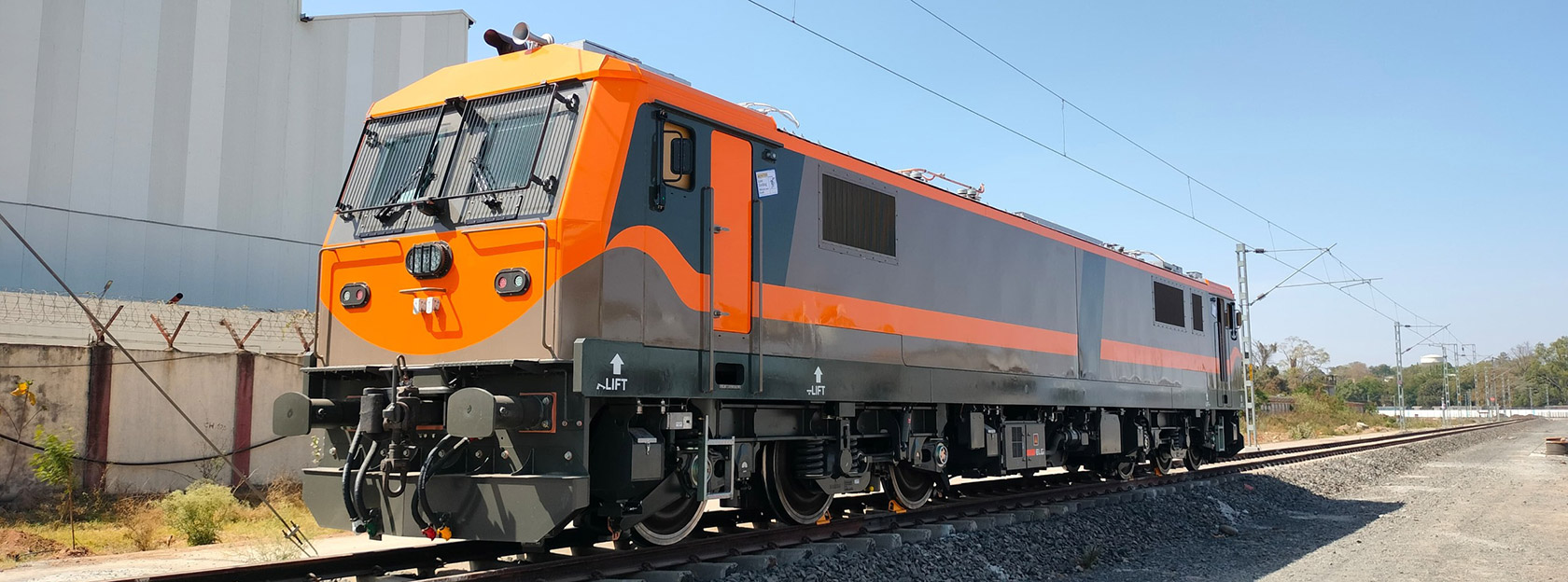
- A WAG D-9 locomotive on trial run at Dahod locomotive factory.
Type and origin
- Power type: Electric
- Designer: Siemens Mobility
- Builder: Siemens Mobility, Rolling Stock Workshop- Dahod
- Total produced: 72 as of November 2026
Specifications
- Configuration
  - UIC: Co′Co′
- Gauge: 5 ft 6 in (1,676 mm)
- Wheel diameter: New: 1,250 mm (4 ft 1 1/4 in), Full worn: 1,150 mm (3 ft 9 in)
- Axle load: 22.5 tonnes (22.1 long tons; 24.8 short tons) (upgradable to 25 tonnes (25 long tons; 28 short tons))
- Loco weight: 135 tonnes (133 long tons; 149 short tons) (upgradable to 150 tonnes (150 long tons; 170 short tons))
- Electric system/s: 25 kV 50 Hz AC Overhead
- Current pickup: dual pantographs
- Traction motors: Siemens Mobility MoComp Traction Motors
  - Continuous: 1,192 kW (1,598 hp)
- Loco brake: Regenerative Brake and Air Brake
- Train brakes: Air Brake
- Safety systems: Kavach ATP, Vigilance Control Device
Performance figures
- Maximum speed: Operational: 120 km/h (75 mph); Tested: 135 km/h (84 mph)
- Power output
  - Continuous: 9,000 hp (6,711 kW)
- Tractive effort
  - Starting: 530 kN (120,000 lb_{f}) @ 22.5t/axle load 589 kN (132,000 lb_{f}) @ 25t/axle load
- Dynamic brake peak effort: 331 kN (74,000 lb_{f}) @ 22.5t/axle load 367 kN (83,000 lb_{f}) @ 25t/axle load
Career
- Operators: Indian Railways
- Numbers: 55001+
- Disposition: Active

The Indian locomotive class WAG D-9 is a class of 25 kV AC electric locomotives developed by Siemens for Indian Railways. The model name stands for broad gauge (W), AC Current (A), Goods traffic (G). With 9,000 horsepower (6,711 kilowatts), it is the second most powerful freight locomotive in the Indian Railways after WAG-12 along with WAG-9 HH. The first prototype of the locomotive was unveiled on 26 May 2025.

== Introduction ==
The WAG D-9 locomotive is a "Heavy Haul" freight locomotive, conceived in response to the growth in rail freight, and the demand for powerful electric freight locomotives following the complete electrification of the Indian Railways network.

In January 2023, Indian Railways placed an order with Siemens Mobility for 1,200 freight locomotives, each with a power output of 9,000 horsepower (6,711 kilowatts). It was the largest locomotive order ever for Siemens Mobility and the biggest order in Siemens India's history. The contract is valued at approximately ₹26000 crore (approx. $3 billion), excluding taxes and potential price adjustments.

== Design and Testing ==
The 1,676 mm gauge Co'Co' locomotives, operating at 25 kV 50 Hz, are designed to pull 4,500-ton loads at speeds of up to 120 km/h along the Dedicated Freight Corridors (DFCs). They will feature advanced propulsion systems, manufactured locally at Siemens facilities in India. To ensure maximum efficiency and reliability, Siemens Mobility will utilize its Railigent platform for optimal performance and availability.

Artificial intelligence has been utilised in the locomotives to predict failures before they occur to improve availability. They are also equipped with Kavach (Automatic Train Protection System). It also features an improved monitoring and diagnostic platform, and an advanced continuous real-time tracking through GPS.

This is the first rolling stock in India to get certified under the stringent EN-14363 (UIC-518) (Criterion 4) for assessment of rolling stock dynamic behaviour. Trials were conducted by the Research Design and Standards Organisation (RDSO) and were completed in late 2025 on the Nagpur-Itarsi and Jodhpur sections. It will pull freight and non push-pull Amrit Bharat Express trains(which have a matching livery) after speed trials

== Locomotive shed ==
Zone	Name	Shed Code	Quantity
South Coast Railway	Visakhapatnam(D)	VSKP	72
Total locomotives active as of November 2026			72

== Manufacturing and maintenance ==
The locomotives will be delivered over a span of eleven years, with the contract also covering full-service maintenance for 35 years.

Assembly will take place at the Indian Railways facility in Dahod, Gujarat, while maintenance will be carried out at four depots in Vishakhapatnam, Raipur, Kharagpur, and Pune. Both assembly and maintenance will be conducted in collaboration with Indian Railways personnel.

== Importance of the locomotive ==
Indian Railways aims to reduce carbon emissions by over 450 million tonnes by maximizing the use of Dedicated Freight Corridors (DFCs) instead of road transport. The 9000 HP locomotives will enhance the efficiency of these corridors and support the Railways' sustainability goal of full electrification, adoption of green technologies, and sustainable practices. Additionally, this initiative will attempt to increase the railways' share of freight transport from the current 27% to 40-45%, supporting the government's logistics expansion plans.
