= Diesel Loco Shed, Visakhapatnam =

Loco shed in Andhra Pradesh, India

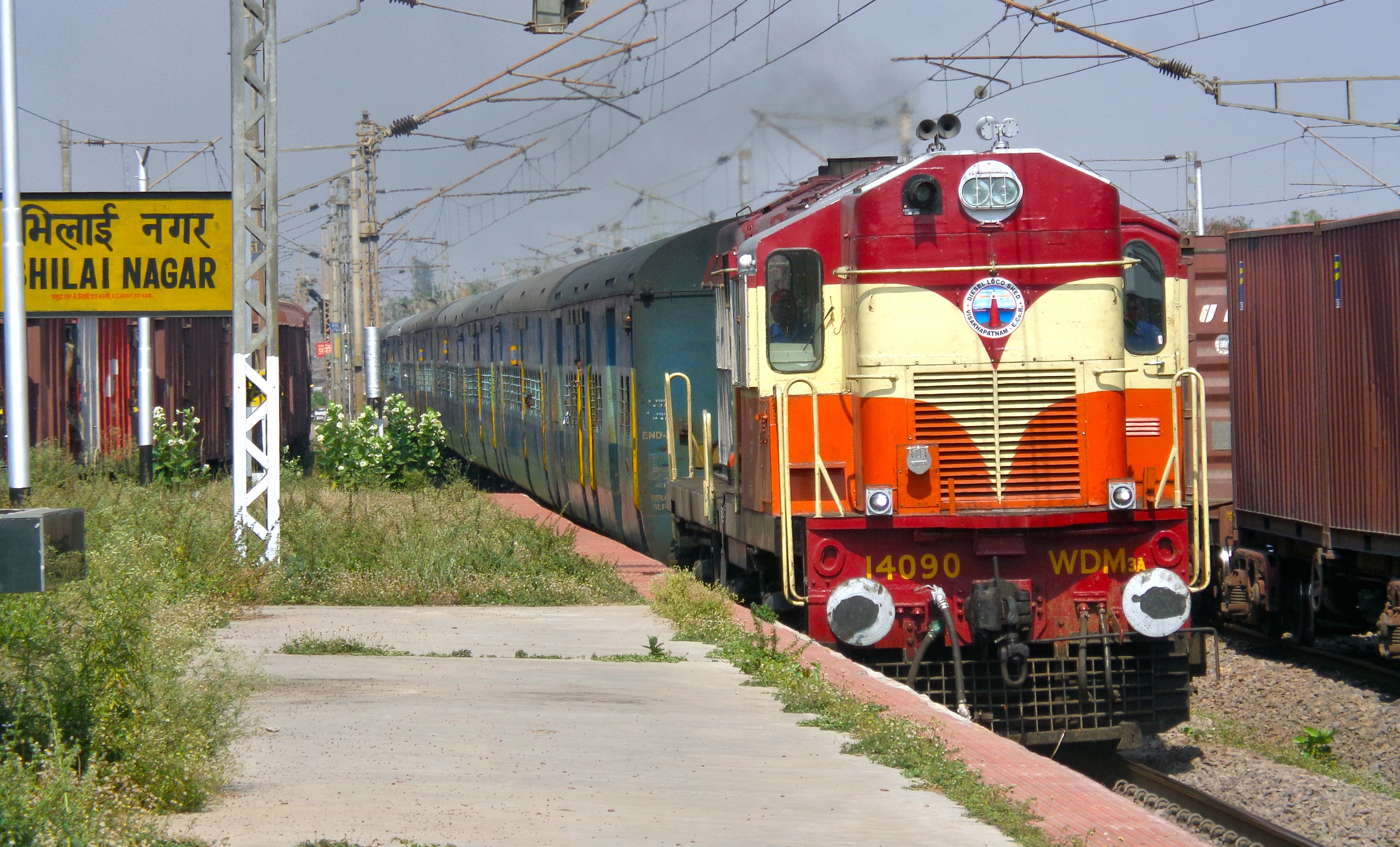
- VSKP based WDM-3A at Bhilai Nagar.

- Location within Andhra Pradesh

Location
- Location: Andhra Pradesh, India
- Coordinates: 17.7291667°N 83.2677778°E

Characteristics
- Owner: Indian Railways
- Operator: South Coast Railway zone
- Depot code: VSKP (D)
- Type: Motive power depot
- Rolling stock: WDG-3A; WDG-4/4D; WAG-9; WAG D-9

History
- Opened: 1 May 1965; 61 years ago

The Diesel Loco Shed, Visakhapatnam (DLS/VSKP) is an engine shed located in Visakhapatnam, Andhra Pradesh, India. Administered by the Visakhapatnam railway division of South Coast Railway, it was established on 2 May 1965 with a fleet of 13 WDM-1 locomotives. As of February 2026, it is one of the biggest diesel sheds of the Indian Railways with over 200 locomotives.

== History ==
Visakhapatnam Diesel Loco Shed was established on 2 May 1965 for the transportation of iron ore from Bailadila mines to Visakhapatnam Port. Its initial fleet contained 13 WDM-1 locomotives.

== Operations ==
It is the biggest Diesel Loco Shed in Indian Railways having a capacity to hold more than 300 locos, and the largest in Asia based on that capacity. It mainly provided Diesel locos to the unelectrified sections of ECoR and sections of SCoR.

== Locomotives ==
Serial No.	Locomotive Class	Horsepower	Quantity
1.	WDG-3A	3100	1
2.	WDG-4/4D	4500	131
3.	WAG-9	6120	166
4.	WAG D-9	9000	45
Total Locomotives Active as of June 2026			343

== See also ==
- Electric Loco Shed, Visakhapatnam
- Electric Loco Shed, Angul
