= Suvarnabhumi Airport Automated People Mover =

Transit system in Bangkok, Thailand

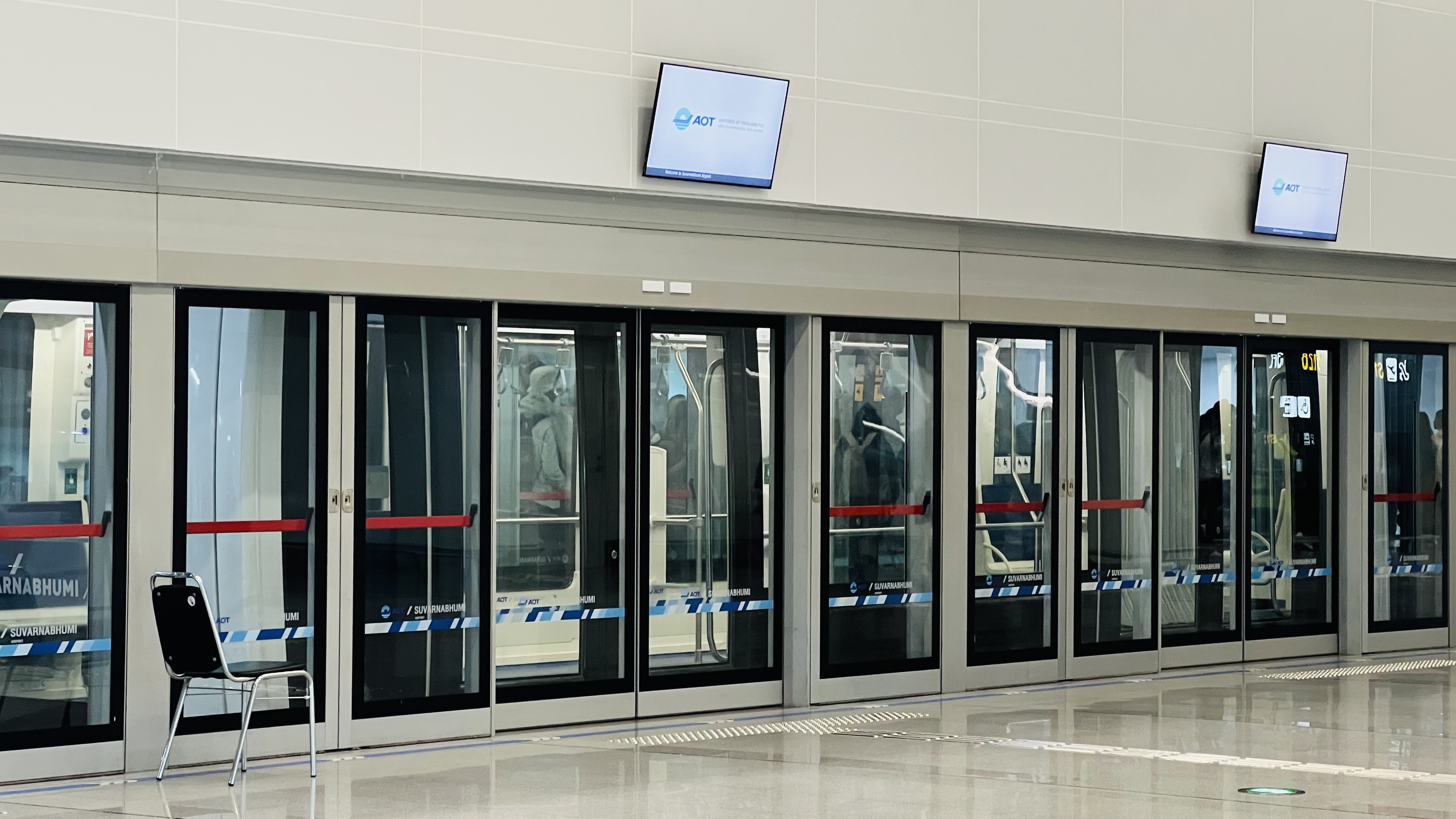
- An APM vehicle at the SAT-1 Building stop

Overview
- Locale: Suvarnabhumi Airport, Bangkok
- Transit type: People mover
- Number of lines: 1
- Number of stations: 2

Operation
- Began operation: September 28, 2023; 3 years ago
- Operator: Suvarnabhumi Airport
- Number of vehicles: 6

Technical
- System length: 1 km (0.62 mi)
- Electrification: 750V DC

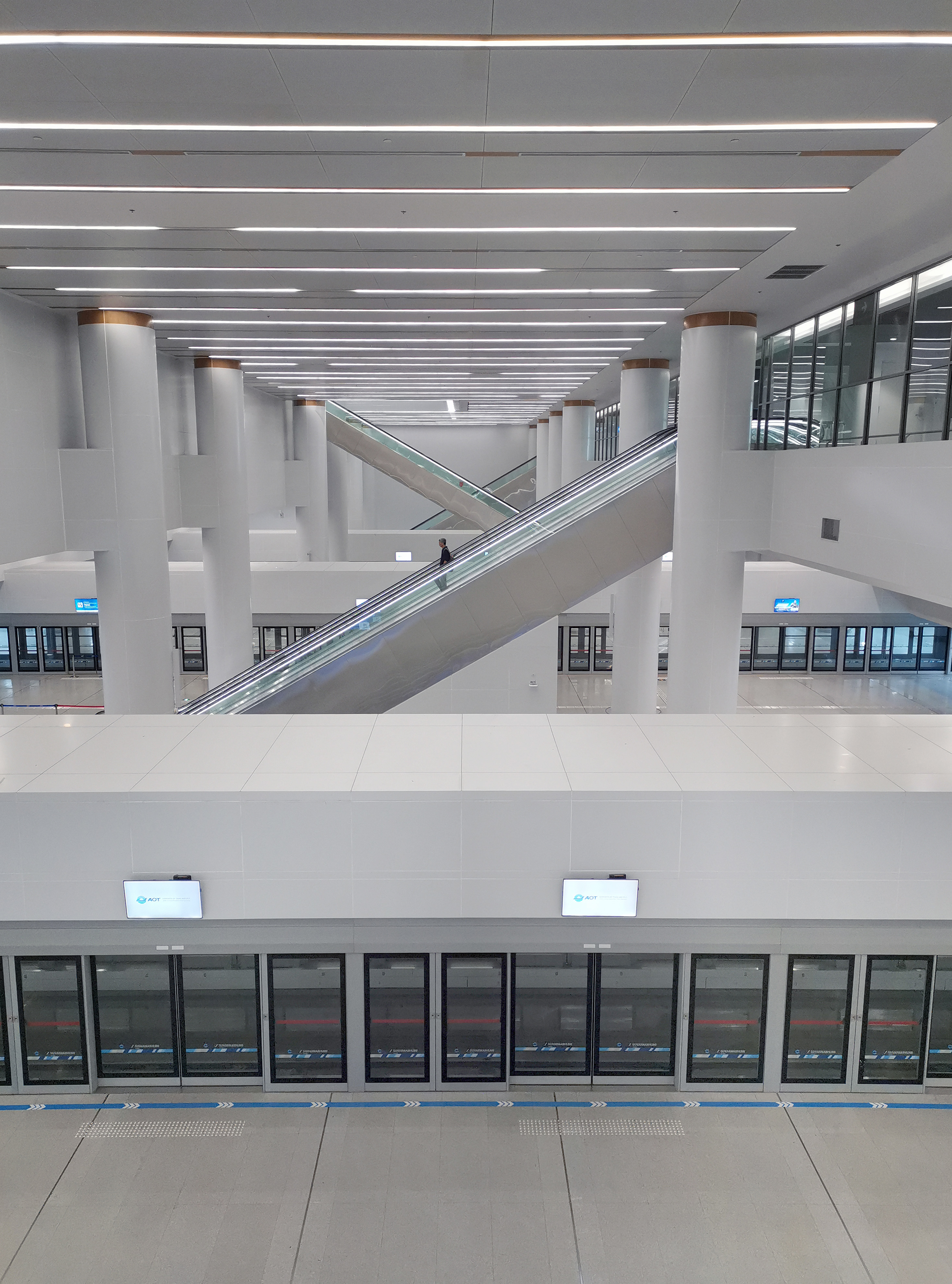
Platforms

The Suvarnabhumi Airport Automated People Mover (APM) (Thai: ระบบขนส่งผู้โดยสารอัตโนมัติท่าอากาศยานสุวรรณภูมิ) is an underground automated people mover located in the property of Suvarnabhumi Airport, Bangkok. It opened on 28 September 2023 (the airport's 17th anniversary) as part of the partial opening of Suvarnabhumi Airport Midfield Satellite Concourse 1 (SAT-1) and connects the main terminal with SAT-1. It is the only airport people mover system in Thailand and is 1 km in length.

== Operations ==
There are 2 stations served by the Suvarnabhumi APM: Main Terminal Building (MTB) station and SAT-1 Building station. Trains operate 24 hours a day at 3-minute intervals, taking approximately 2 minutes each way. All stations are equipped with platform screen doors and information screens.

Station	Transfer/Notes
Main Terminal Building (MTB)	Suvarnabhumi Airport Main Terminal Arrivals Gates A-B-C-D-E-F-G
SAT-1 Building (SAT-1)	Suvarnabhumi Airport Midfield Satellite Concourse 1 Gates S101-S128

== Rolling Stock ==
The system uses the driverless NeoVal (AirVal version) with regenerative braking and rubber tyres running on concrete guideways, similar to that of Rennes Metro Line B. Six two-car sets were produced by the Siemens production plant in Vienna, Austria. It has a car width of 2.80m (9 ft 2 in), with each car having 25 seats. Each train set has a capacity of 210 passengers, and upon calculation, the route can handle 3590 passengers per hour one way. It has a maximum speed of 80 km/h (50 mph), although the vehicles never reach such speeds in service.

The train uses the automated TrainGuard MT Communicated Based Control System (CBTC) for signalling.

The first train set arrived at Suvarnabhumi Airport on 15 July 2020.

== See also ==
- Airport Rail Link (Bangkok)
