= Véhicule Automatique Léger =

Type of people mover system

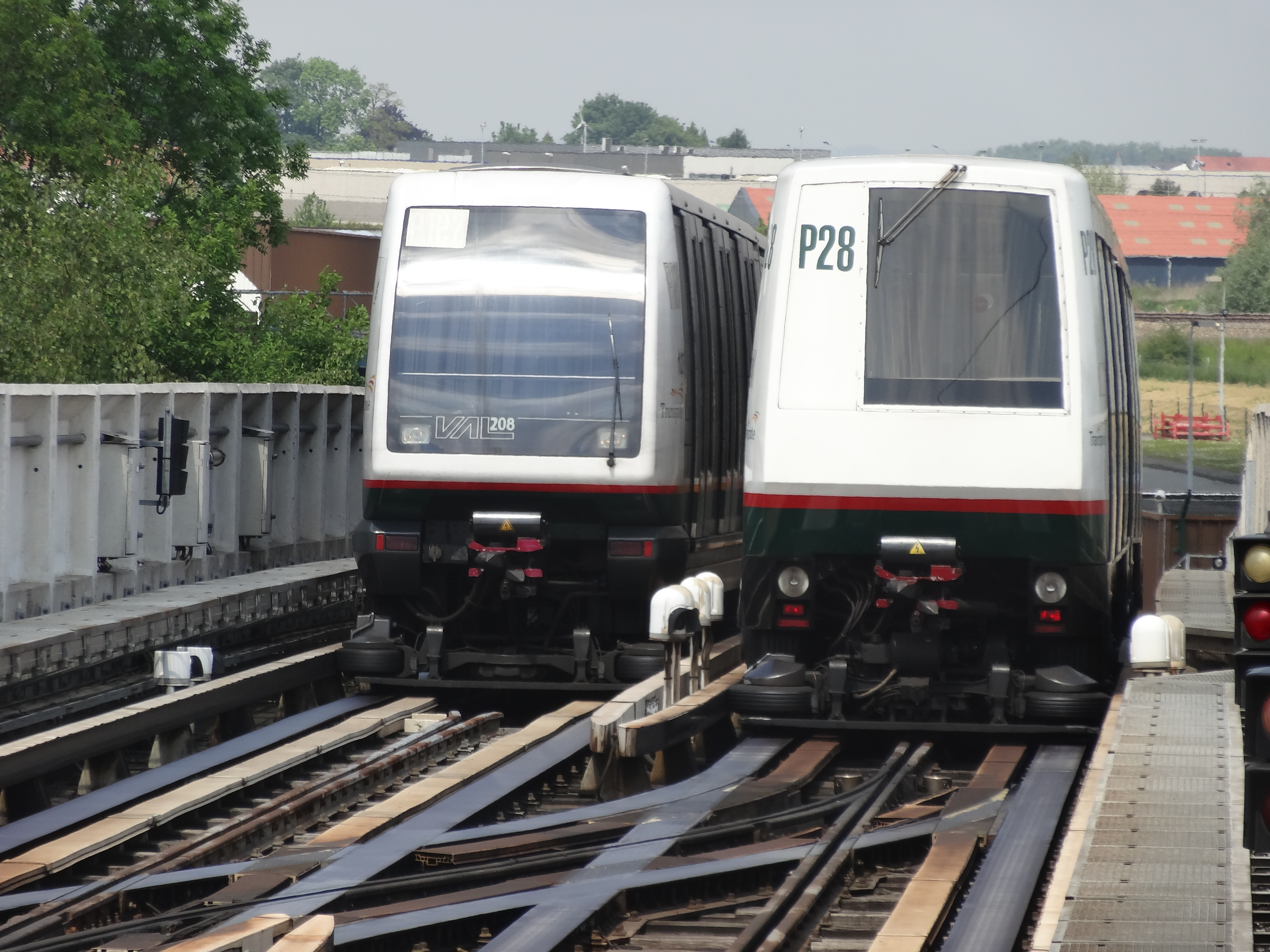
VAL 206 (right) and VAL 208 (left) as used on Lille Metro.

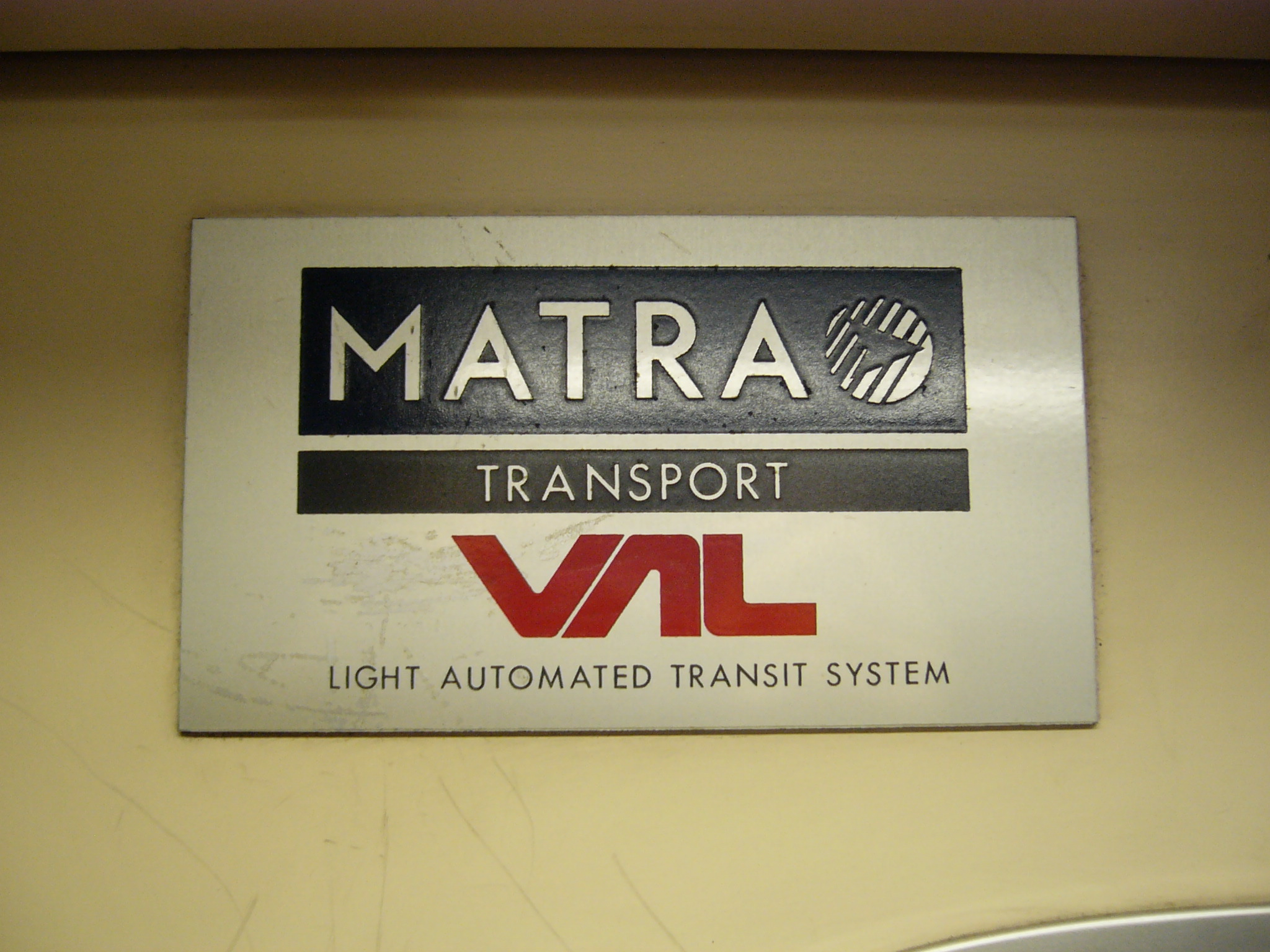
Interior of VAL 256 with manufacturer's decal.

Véhicule Automatique Léger (lit. 'automatic light vehicle') or VAL is a type of driverless (automated), rubber-tyred, light metro (people mover). The technology was developed at the Lille University of Science and Technology, was marketed by Matra, and first used in the early 1980s for the Lille Metro system, one of the world's first fully automated mass-transit rail networks, preceded only by the Port Island Line in Kobe, Japan. The VAL technology is now marketed by Siemens, which acquired Matra in the late 1990s.

A total of 11 lines in 8 systems based on the VAL technology are currently in operation worldwide. The current version of the VAL product is marketed as NeoVal (with a distinction between AirVal for airport environments and CityVal for more conventional transit environments).

The name is a backronym, with the first project to use the technology nicknamed VAL after the routing of the line: Villeneuve d'Ascq à Lille (lit. 'Villeneuve d'Ascq to Lille').

== Technology ==
=== Original VAL ===
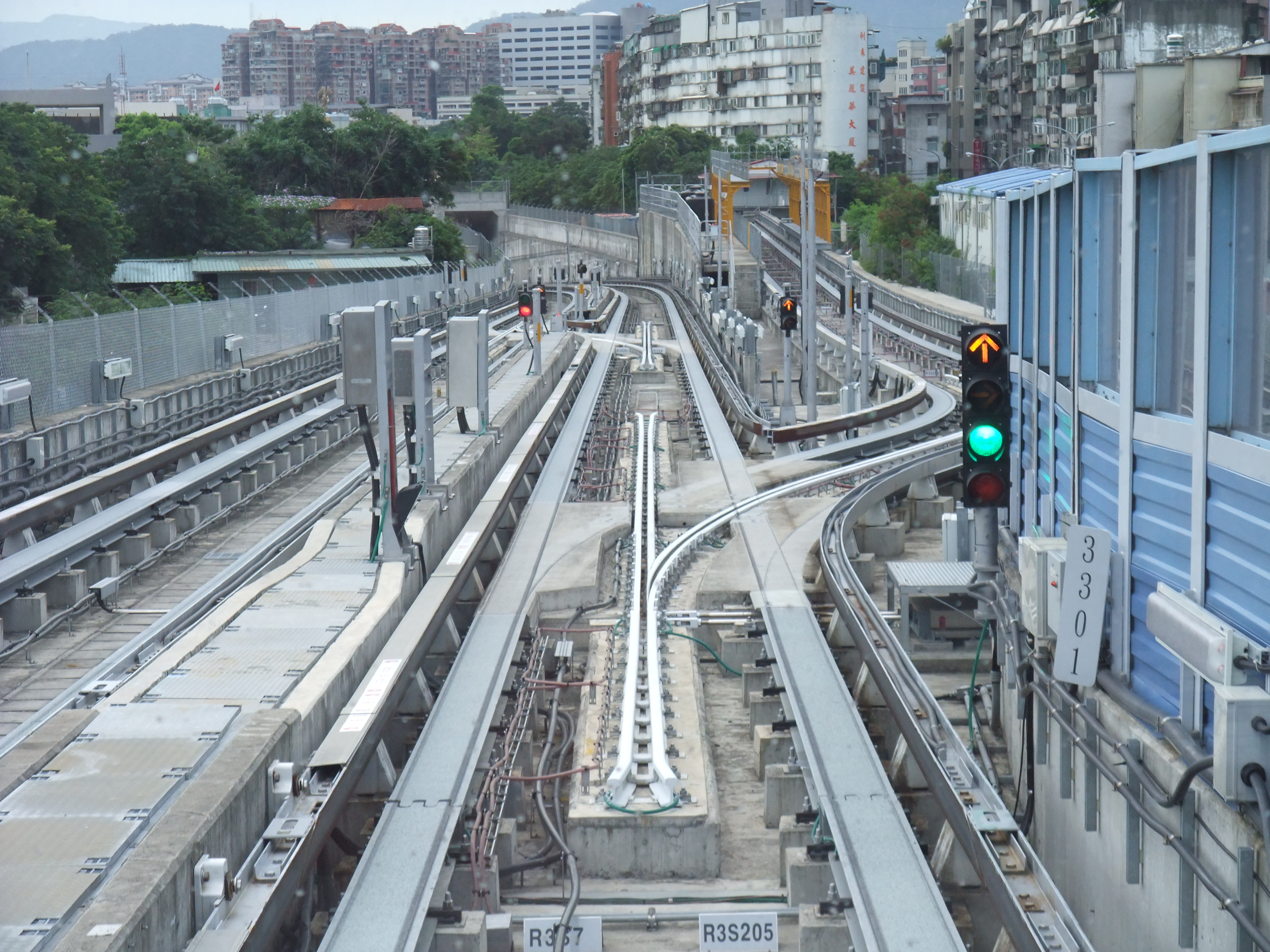
VAL-style track point as used on the Taipei Wenhu Line.

The VAL system uses a fully automated elevated guideway, which may be metal or concrete depending on prevailing weather conditions. Primary suspension is by rubber tires, with pairs of horizontal tires to provide lateral guidance. Electrical power at 750 V DC is collected by shoes from the guidebars.

The vehicles are lightweight 2-car sets (VAL 206 or VAL 208) with 124 total capacity, or twin sets (VAL 256) with 80 seated and 160 standing capacity. All axles on these vehicles are motored with 150 kW (201 hp) electrical motors. The system detects the location of trains on the guideway by the use of ultrasonic sensors. VAL uses fixed-block signalling.

VAL can cope with unanticipated demand by inserting additional trains into the network as required by remote command from the control center. The control center computer system automatically speeds up or slows down trains in order to maintain a timetable. The VAL system can handle headways as small as 60 seconds, and the Lille VAL system rapidly proved itself with a 99.8% availability.

In contrast to another early driverless metro system, the Vancouver SkyTrain, the VAL design uses platforms that are separated from the rollways by a glass partition, to prevent waiting passengers from straying or falling onto the rollways. Platform screen doors – produced by Swiss glass door manufacturer Kaba Gilgen AG – are embedded in these partitions and open in synchrony with the train doors when a train stops at the platform. The original platform-edge doors were manufactured and installed by PLC Peters in Hayes, Middlesex and were used on the first line.

In addition to the trains being driverless, the station platforms are unstaffed in normal operation. In the original Lille metro system, they are monitored by a large closed-circuit television system with 330 cameras and 24 television monitors in a remote control room.

=== NeoVal ===
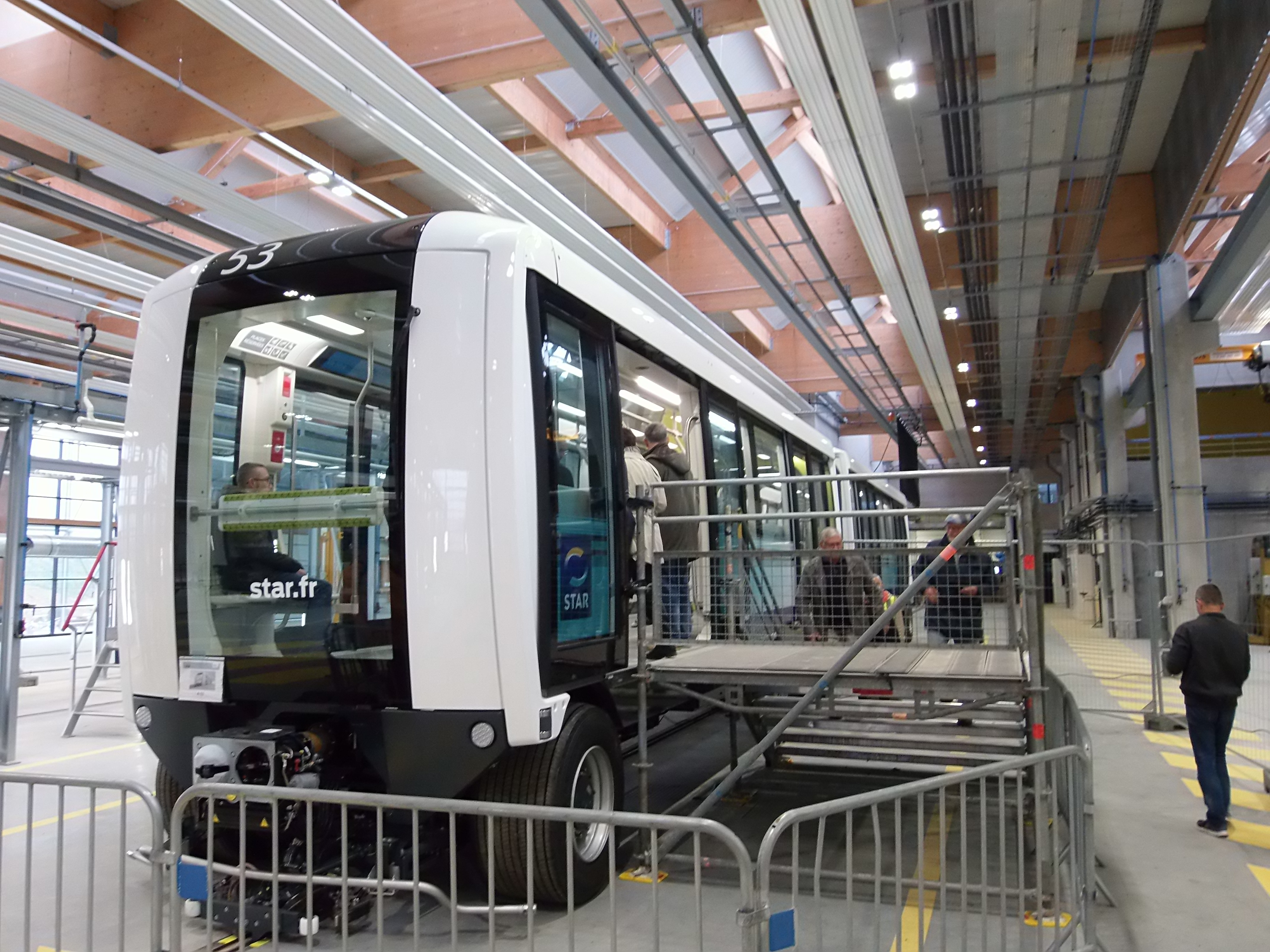
CityVal for Rennes Metro Line B

In 2006 the NeoVal project, successor of the VAL, was announced. It features regenerative braking. 40% of the 62 million Euros set aside for the programme will come from the Agence de l'innovation industrielle (the technology-supporting project agency formerly known as the AII). The program is managed by Siemens Mobility, in association with Lohr Industrie. The NeoVal will be guided by a single central rail, similar to that of the Translohr, and will be able to operate without any electrical supply between the stations (no third rail or overhead lines), making the cost of infrastructure much lower.

The NeoVal is offered in two versions:

- the CityVal version designed for conventional transit environments (car width 2.65 m (8 ft 8 in)) with the first implementation on Line B of the Rennes Metro;
- the AirVal version designed for airport environments (car width 2.80 m (9 ft 2 in)) with the first implementation on the Suvarnabhumi Airport Automated People Mover at Suvarnabhumi Airport, Thailand.

== VAL systems ==
=== Active systems ===
As of July 2021 there are a total of 12 lines in 8 systems operating with VAL technology:

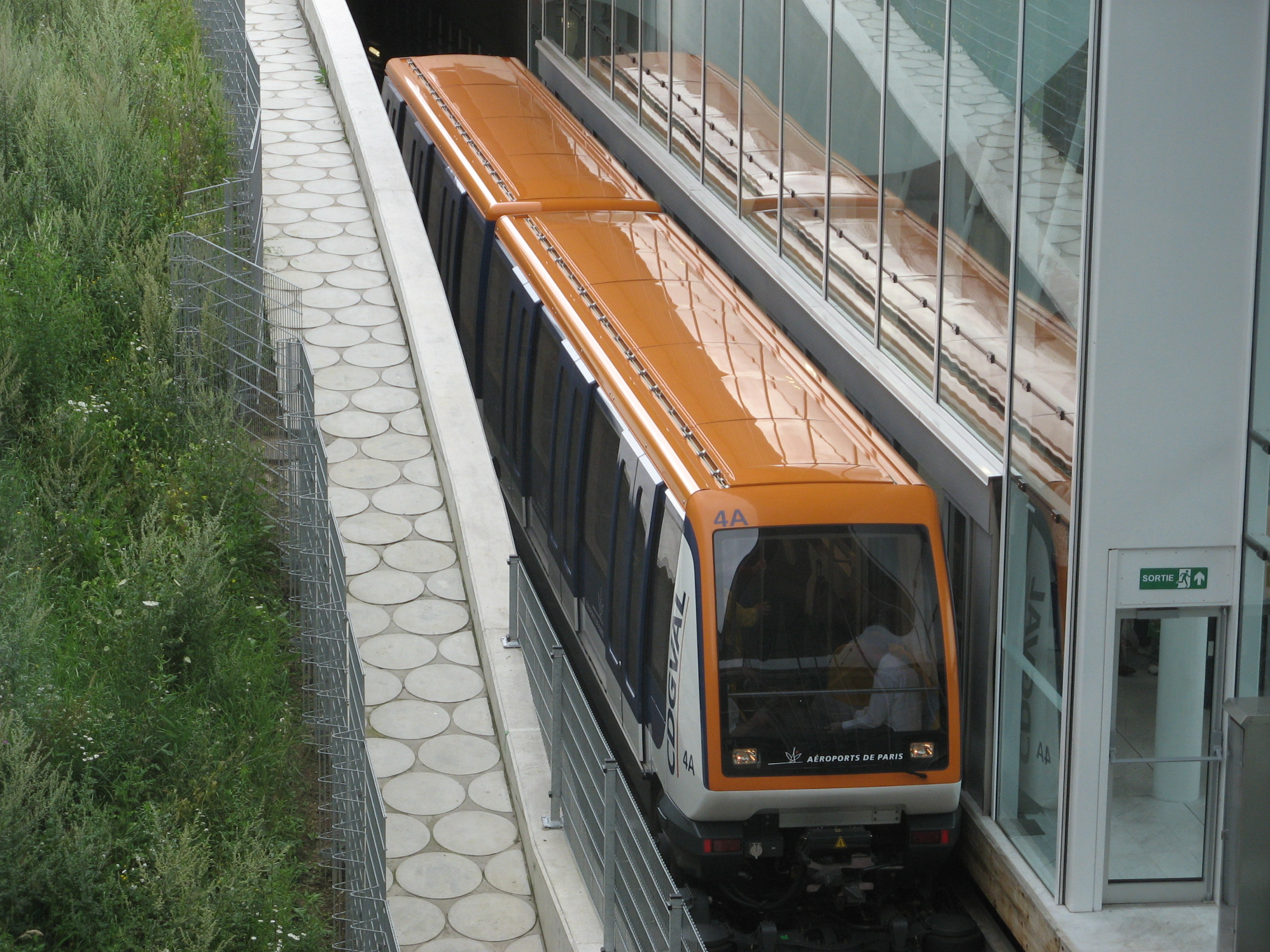
VAL 208 cars on the CDGVAL at Paris CDG airport.

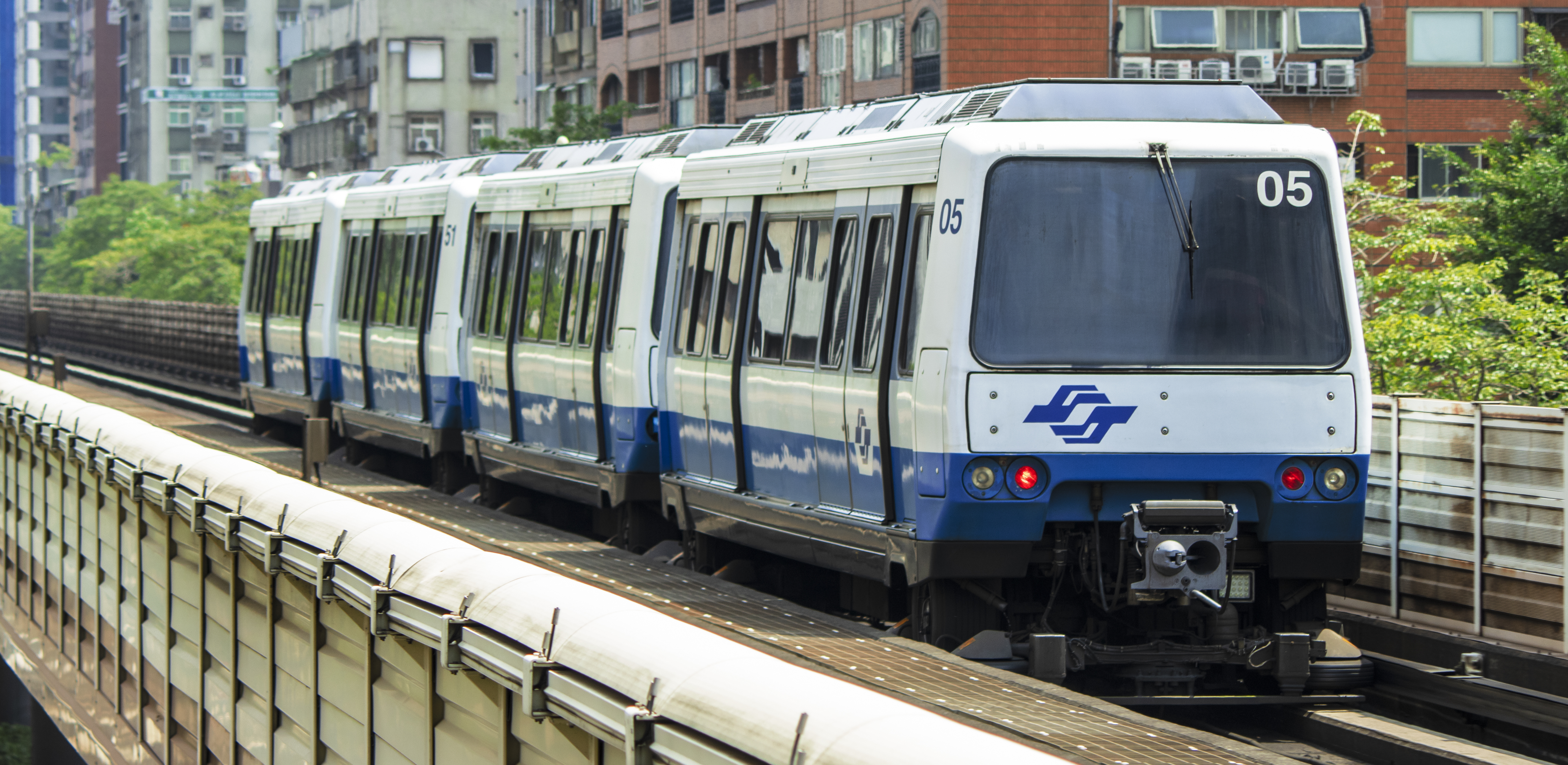
VAL 256 cars on Taipei Metro's Wenhu Line

- Lille Metro (two lines), since 1983, VAL 206 and VAL 208 cars
- Paris Orlyval, since 1991, VAL 206 cars
- Toulouse Metro (two lines), since 1993, VAL 206 and VAL 208 cars
- Taipei Metro Wenhu (Brown) line, since 1996, larger VAL 256 cars using the MAGGALY technology from Lyon Metro Line D and Bombardier signaling
- Rennes Metro (two lines), since 2002, VAL 208 and CityVal cars
- Turin Metro, since 2006, VAL 208 cars
- Paris CDGVAL (two lines), since 2007, VAL 208 cars
- Uijeongbu U Line, since 2012, VAL 208 cars with air conditioning, locally designated the U100
- Bangkok Suvarnabhumi Airport, since 2023 - 6 2-car AirVal trains
- Frankfurt Airport SkyLine (new line to Terminal 3) - 24 2-car AirVal trains

=== Defunct systems ===
- Airport Transit System at Chicago's O'Hare International Airport (opened in 1993 and replaced by a Bombardier system in 2019 and reopened in 2021)
- Jacksonville, Florida, had a VAL line inaugurated in 1989; it was shut down in December 1996 and replaced by a monorail, the Jacksonville Skyway. The rolling stock was sold to O'Hare.

== Medium-Capacity Transport System ==
When VAL was introduced to Taipei, the term medium-capacity rail transport system was coined by railway planners to differentiate VAL from heavy rail (metro). Since then, this term has begun to be applied on similar capacity transit systems–mainly in Asian cities–even when the systems are not based on VAL's technology. On Siemens' official website, VAL was during a certain time advertised as the "first fully automated light metro", in which the term "light metro" can be traced back to the Moscow Metro's Butovskaya Line. Siemens now rather uses the terms "medium-capacity metro" or simply refers to VAL as a "people mover".

== See also ==
- Automated guideway transit
- Rubber-tyred tram and Rubber-tyred metro
- Transport in France

Competing systems:

- Bombardier Innovia APM
- Crystal Mover from Mitsubishi Heavy Industries
