= Siemens Mobility =

Railway rolling stock manufacturer

Siemens Mobility GmbH
- Type: Subsidiary
- Industry: Transportation: Railways; Control systems; Digital Services
- Founded: 1989; 37 years ago (Siemens Traffic Technology division); 1 August 2018 (restructured)
- Founder: Werner von Siemens
- Headquarters: Munich, Bavaria, Germany
- Area served: Global
- Key people: Michael Peter (CEO); Karl Blaim (CFO)
- Services: Mobile Apps; Data analytics; Maintenance; MaaS
- Revenue: ▲€9.69 billion (2022)
- Number of employees: 34,200 (2017)
- Parent: Siemens
- Divisions: Mobility Management; Rail Electrification; Rolling Stock; Customer Services
- Website: mobility.siemens.com
- Footnotes; Financial figures are for fiscal year 2022.

Siemens Mobility GmbH is a division in Siemens of Germany that specializes in rail transport. With its global headquarters in Munich, Siemens Mobility has four core business units: Mobility Management, dedicated to rail technology and intelligent traffic systems, Railway Electrification, Rolling Stock, and Customer Services.

== History ==
Innovations from the late 19th century, such as the world's first electric train, when Siemens & Halske unveiled a train in which power was supplied through the rails, and the world's first electric tram, with the implementation of 2.5-kilometer-long electric tramway located in Berlin, built at the company's own expense, cemented the use of electric power in transportation systems.

In the following years, inventions such as the first electric trolleybus, mine locomotives, and the first underground railway in continental Europe (in Budapest), set the path from trams and subways to today's high-speed trains.

In 1991, Siemens acquired a 60% shareholding in Duewag. In 1999, Siemens increased its stake in KraussMaffei from 25% to 75%.

Siemens, alongside ThyssenKrupp and Transrapid International, was part of the German consortium that built the Shanghai Maglev, inaugurated in 2002 by the German chancellor, Gerhard Schröder, and the Chinese premier, Zhu Rongji. It was the world's first commercial high-speed magnetic levitation train, which holds the title of the fastest commercial service, travelling up to 430 km/h.

In November 2012, Siemens acquired Invensys Rail for £1.7 billion.

In July 2017, Siemens confirmed it had taken over Hannover-based software company HaCon, to be managed as a separate legal entity. The financial details were not disclosed.

In September 2017, Siemens announced a proposal to merge its transportation division with Alstom, with the objective of creating "a new European champion in the rail industry". The combined rail business, to be named Siemens Alstom and headquartered in Paris, would have had $18 billion U.S. in revenue and employed 62,300 people in more than 60 countries. It was seen as a measure to counter the rise of China's CRRC with support from both the French and German governments. However, in February 2019, the European Commission refused permission for the merger to proceed.

During Innotrans in September 2018, Siemens Mobility unveiled the world's first driverless tram in Berlin, the result of a joint research and development project with ViP Verkehrsbetriebe Potsdam, on a six-kilometre section of the tram network in Potsdam, Germany.

== Key locations ==
Location	Country	Main activities	References
Port Melbourne	Australia	Railway signalling design and manufacturing	
Graz	Austria	Bogie and pantograph development and manufacturing	
Vienna	Austria	Metro-train and passenger-coach development and manufacturing	
Prague, Plzeň, Brno and Ostrava	Czech Republic	Rolling-stock design and engineering across the four cities; railway-automation research and development in Prague and Plzeň	
Châtillon	France	Development of automatic train-control systems using communications-based train control (CBTC)	
Toulouse	France	Development and engineering of VAL automated metro systems; maintenance and related services	
Berlin	Germany	Railway-automation development and manufacturing at Berlin-Treptow	
Braunschweig	Germany	Railway-signalling and automation development and manufacturing	
Erlangen	Germany	Railway engineering and management	
Krefeld	Germany	Regional and high-speed train development and manufacturing, including Mireo, Desiro and Velaro	
Munich (Allach)	Germany	Locomotive manufacturing, including Vectron, and rail services	
Dahod	India	Final assembly, testing and commissioning of 9,000-horsepower electric freight locomotives at the Indian Railways factory	
Kragujevac	Serbia	Avenio tram manufacturing, rolling-stock components and engineering	
Tres Cantos	Spain	Railway-signalling development and rolling-stock engineering	
Chippenham	United Kingdom	Railway-signalling development and manufacturing	
Goole	United Kingdom	Metro-train assembly for the Piccadilly line	
Lexington, North Carolina	United States	Passenger-coach manufacturing and rolling-stock overhaul	
Louisville, Kentucky	United States	Railway-signalling and communications equipment development and manufacturing	
Sacramento, California	United States	North American rolling-stock headquarters; locomotive, light-rail vehicle and passenger-coach manufacturing	

== Products ==
=== Locomotives ===
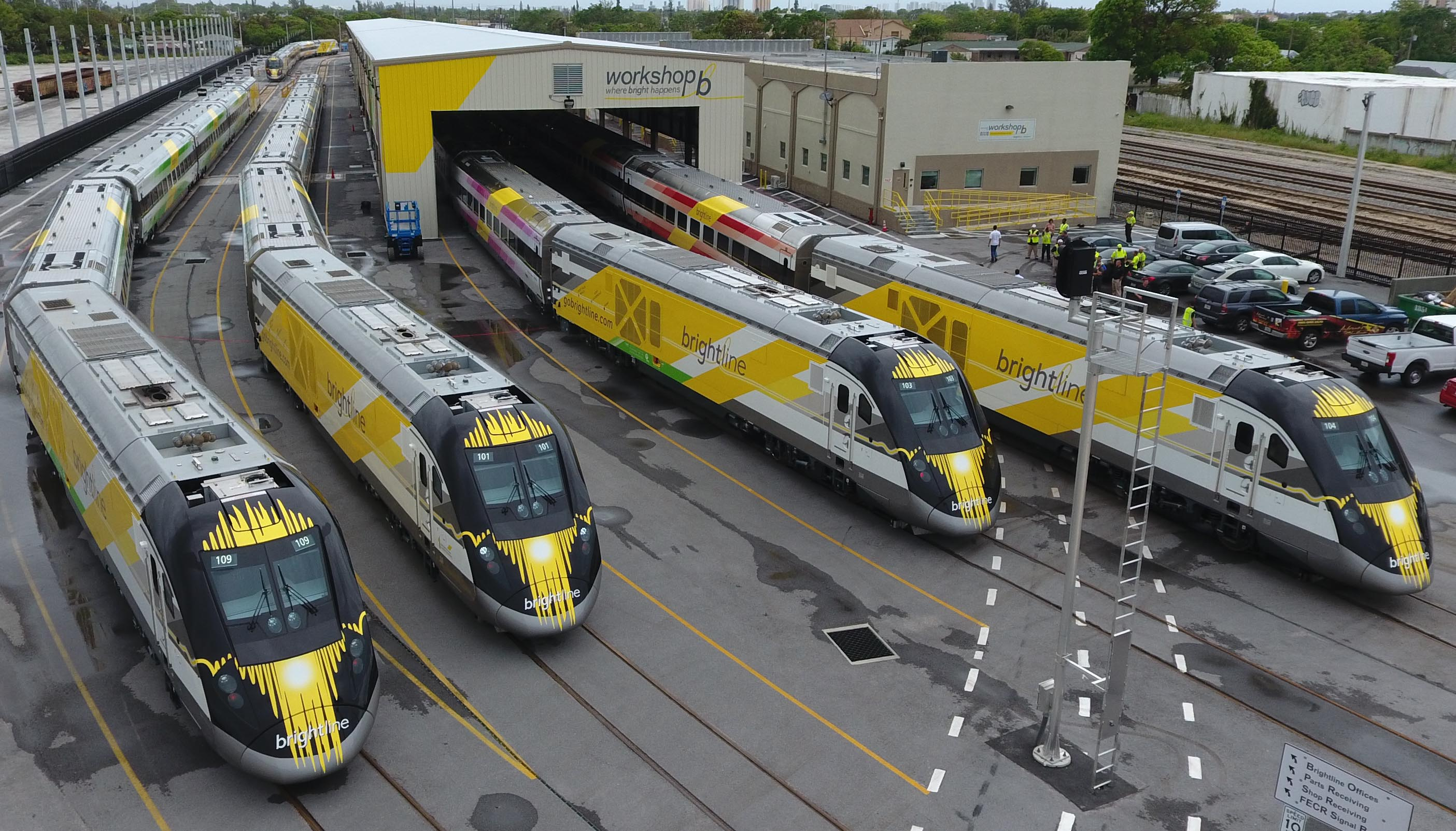
Brightline's Siemens Charger locomotives and Venture trainsets in Florida, U.S.

- ACS-64
- Asiarunner
- Charger
- Eurorunner
- EuroSprinter
- E40 AG-V1 (E40AC)
- Korail Class 8200
- NSB Di6
- NSB Di8
- SNCB Class 77
- Vectron
- VSFT G 322
- WAG D-9

=== EMU and DMU ===
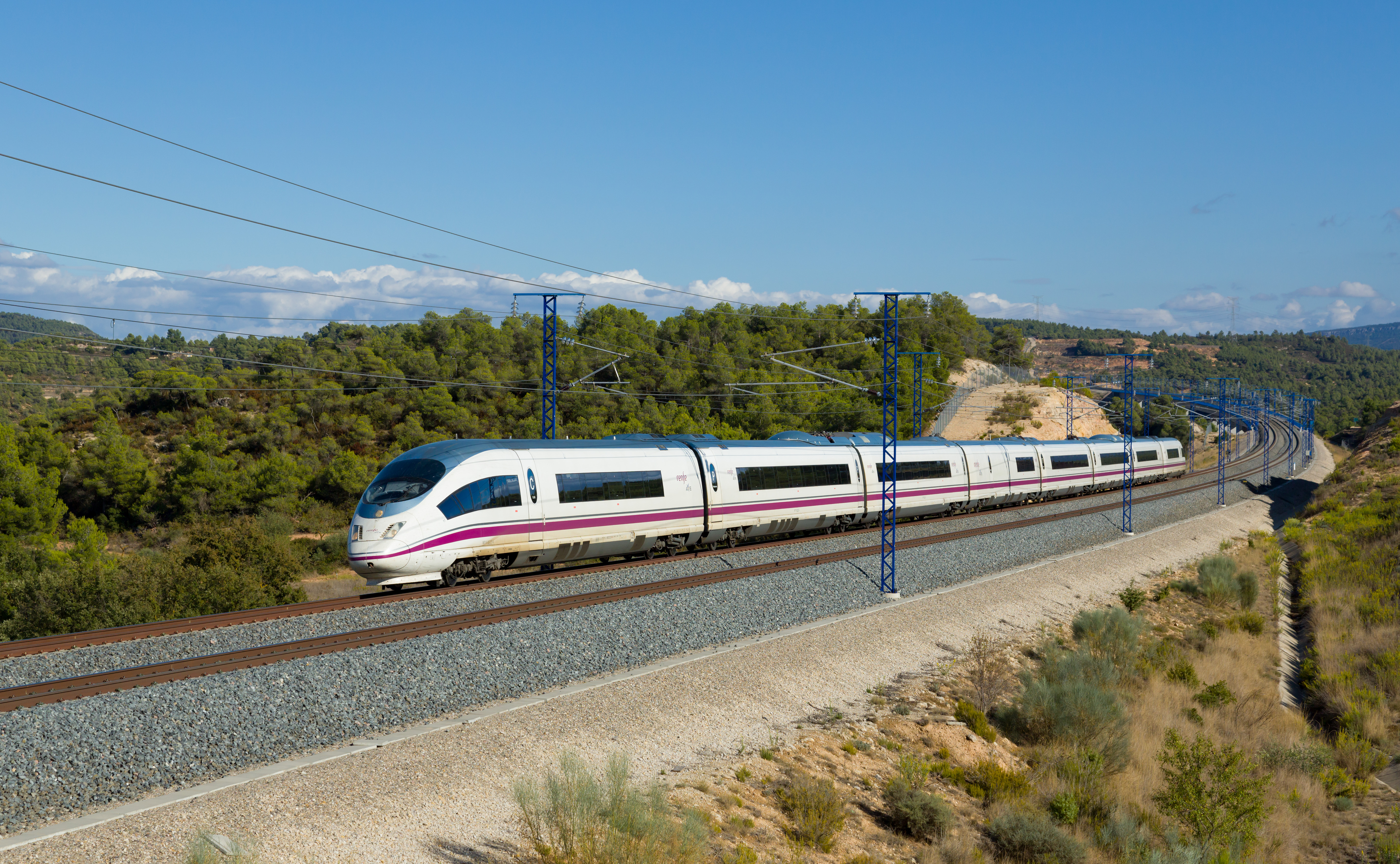
Velaro EMU used in Spain

- British Rail Class 332 - bodywork built by CAF
- British Rail Class 333 - bodywork built by CAF
- Desiro EMU/DMU
  - Desiro Double Deck
    - SBB-CFF-FFS RABe 514
  - British Rail Class 185
  - British Rail Class 350
  - British Rail Class 360
  - British Rail Class 380
  - British Rail Class 444
  - British Rail Class 450
  - British Rail Class 700
  - British Rail Class 707
  - British Rail Class 717
- ICx
- Mireo EMU
- Nexas
- ÖBB Class 4011
- ÖBB Class 4020
- Velaro EMU
  - British Rail Class 374/Eurostar e320
  - TCDD HT80000
  - AVE Class 103
  - CRH3
  - Sapsan

=== Passenger coaches ===
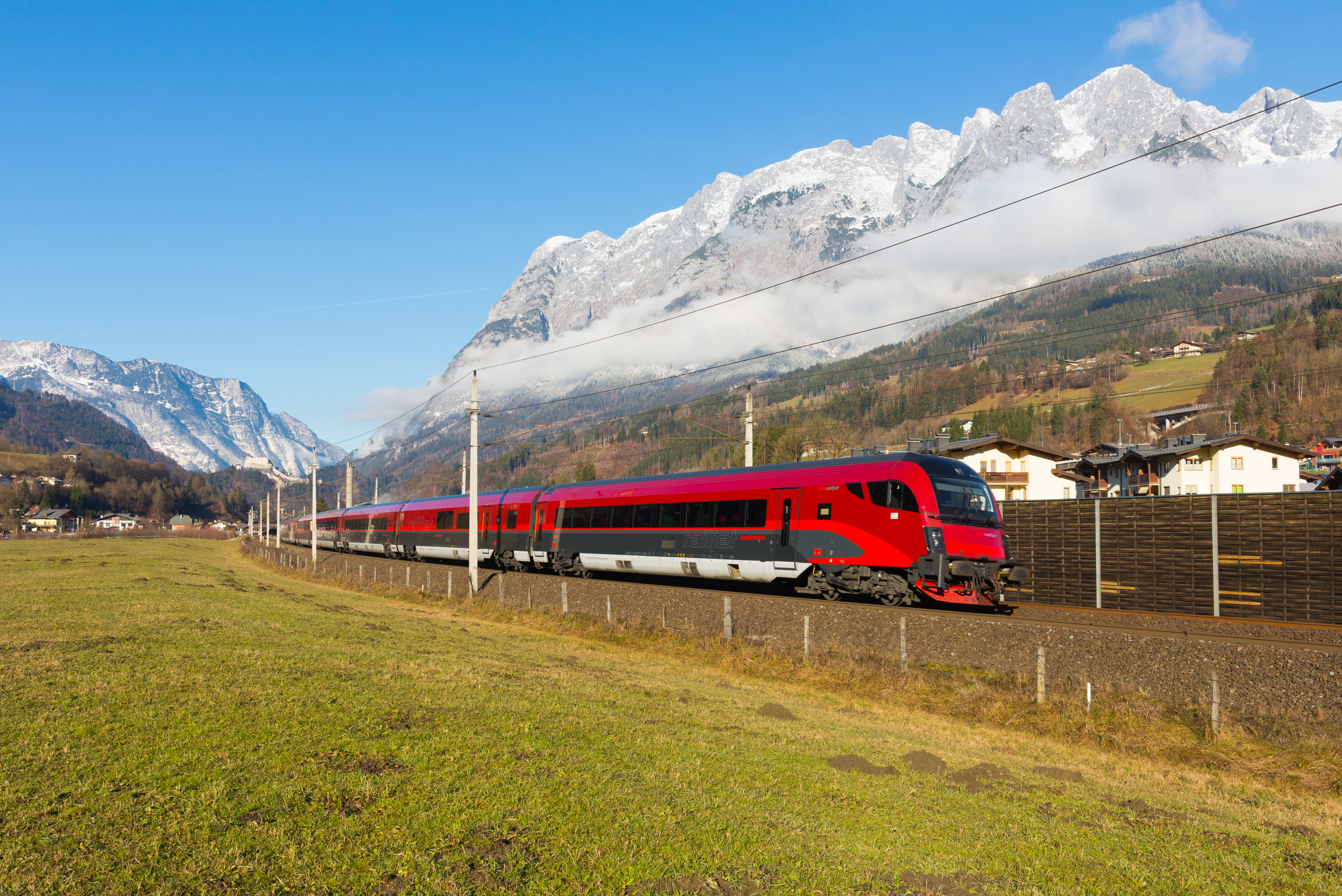
Viaggio Comfort trainset in Austria

- Venture
- Viaggio Classic
- Viaggio Comfort
- Viaggio Light
- Viaggio Next Level
- Viaggio Twin - double deck coach

=== Light Rail/Trams ===
Light rail vehicles

- North American first generation/Frankfurt U-Bahn: U2
- North American second generation: SD-100/SD-160, SD-400/SD-460, SD660
- North American third generation/Île-de-France tramway Line 4 and Mulhouse tramway: S200, S700/S70/Avanto

Trams

- Avenio
- Combino
- Ultra Low Floor tram
- P2000

=== People movers ===
- VAL series - acquired from Matra
  - VAL 208 - used by CDGVAL, Rennes Metro, U Line, Turin Metro
  - VAL 206 - used by Orlyval, Toulouse Metro
  - AIRVAL - used by Suvarnabhumi Airport Automated People Mover

=== Metro/Subway ===
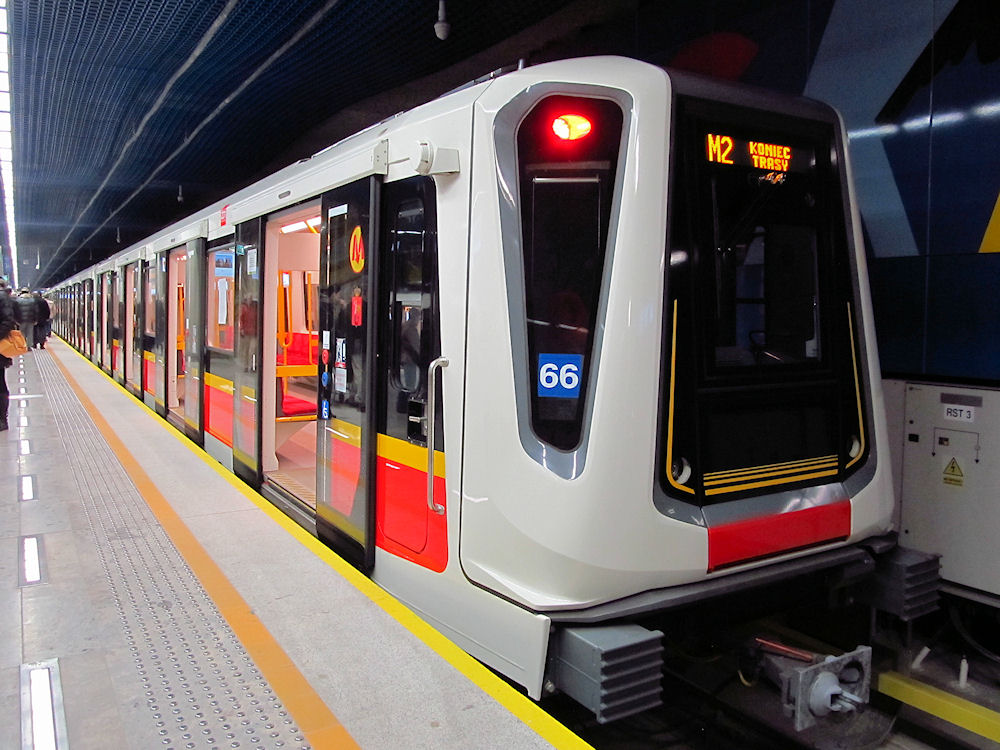
Inspiro metro cars in Warsaw, Poland

- Blue Line (MBTA) - 0700 Series
- Guangzhou Metro A1
- Guangzhou Metro B1
- Singapore Mass Rapid Transit Siemens C651
- Shanghai Metro AC01 and AC02
- Shanghai Metro AC05
- Inspiro
- London Underground 2024 stock
- Modular Metro
- Oslo Metro OS MX3000
- Taipei Metro C321
- Taipei Metro C341
- Tren Urbano - customized train set

Maglev

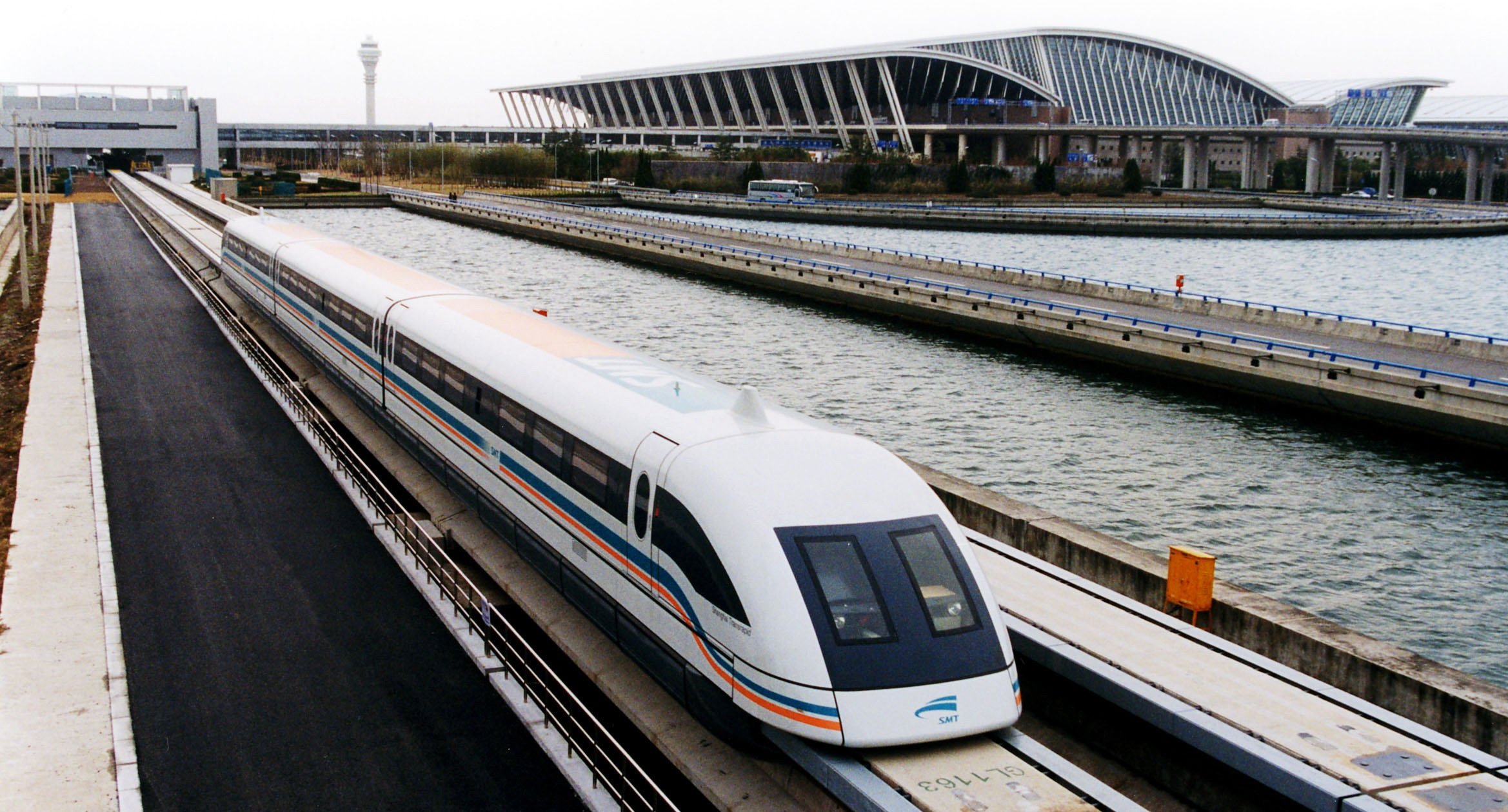
Transrapid maglev train at Pudong International Airport, Shanghai, China

- Transrapid (Shanghai)

=== Railway Signalling ===
- Trainguard MT - a signalling block systems based on CBTC

=== Digital Services ===
- Data Capture Unit (DCU) - Secure connectivity
- Railigent (CS) - Data Analytics
- Rail Mall (CS) - Spare parts eCommerce
- Intermodal solutions (IMS) - Passenger Apps (planning & eTickets)

Notes

Some R160 cars were installed with Siemens propulsions. This was done after the New York City Subway tested a propulsion variant on its R143 cars.

== See also ==
Competitors:

- Alstom
- CAF
- CRRC
- Electro-Motive Diesel
- GE Transportation
- Hitachi Rail
- Hyundai Rotem
- Kinki Sharyo
- Stadler Rail
- Talgo
