= VAL 206 =

Automated guideway transit system manufactured by Matra

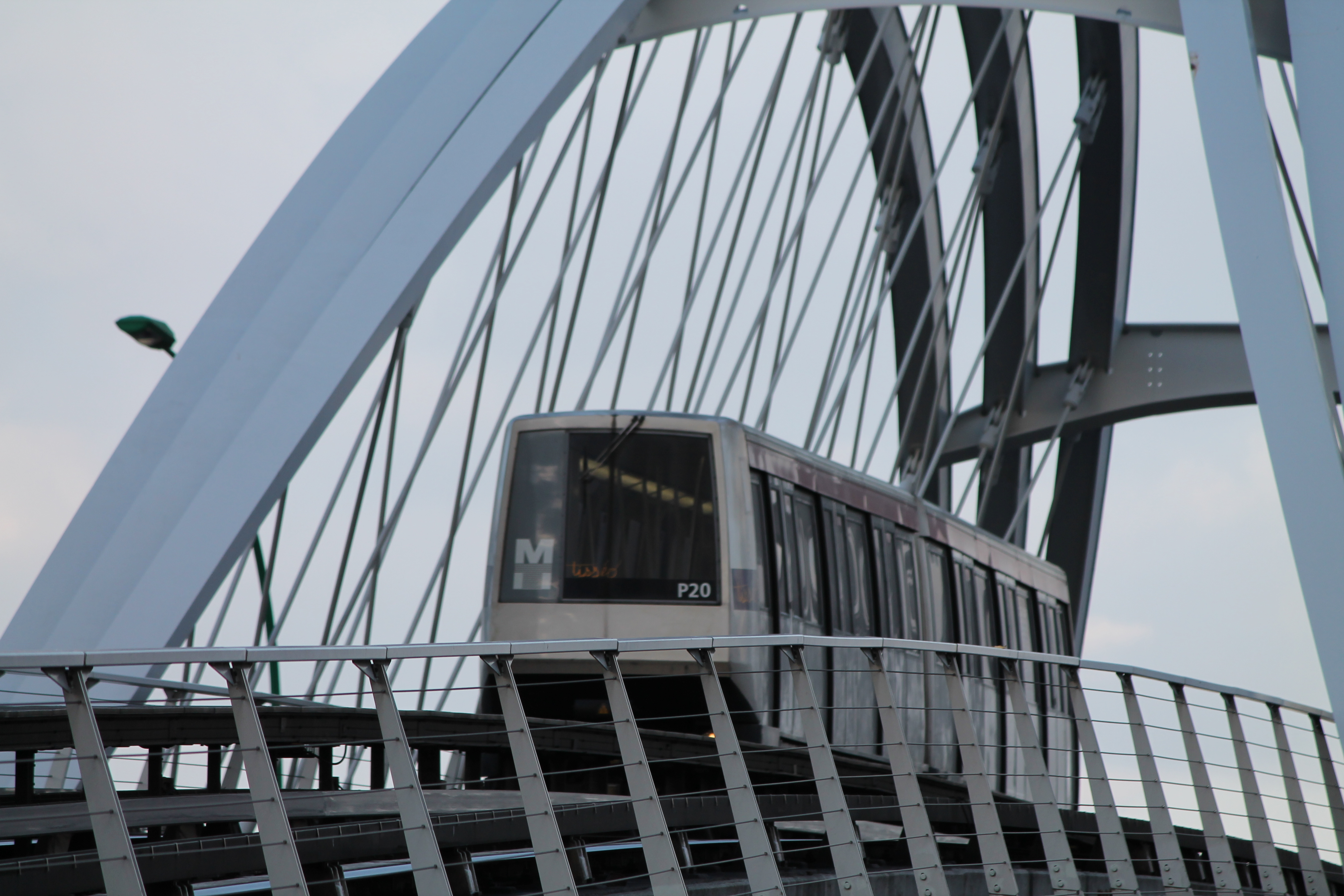
- VAL 206 train in Toulouse
- In service: 1983–present
- Manufacturer: Matra, GEC-Alsthom
- Formation: 2 cars per set

Specifications
- Car body construction: Aluminium alloy
- Car length: 12.7 m (41 ft 8 in)
- Width: 2.06 m (6 ft 9 1/8 in)
- Height: 3.25 m (10 ft 8 in)
- Doors: 3 per side
- Maximum speed: 80 km/h (49.7 mph)
- Traction system: GTO chopper control (GEC-Alsthom)
- Traction motors: 4 × 120 kW (160 hp) DC motor
- Power output: 480 kW (640 hp)
- Transmission: Right-angle Cardan drive
- Acceleration: 1.3 m/s^{2} (4.3 ft/s^{2})
- Deceleration: 1.3 m/s^{2} (4.3 ft/s^{2})
- Electric system(s): 750 V DC third rail
- Track gauge: Null (rubber tyre guideway)

The VAL 206 is one of the VAL series, an automated guideway transit system manufactured by Matra. Because it uses rubber tires, it is suitable for applications that require high acceleration / deceleration.

The 206 classification comes from the fact that the width of the vehicle is 206 cm (6 ft 9 1/8 in). The train is two-car formation. It is unmanned operation, but it can also be operated manually as needed. It was succeeded by the VAL 208.

== Overview ==
Because of automatic operation, the delay is small, the train density can be increased. On the other hand, since this train is basically a two-car train, it is suitable for low-population areas and medium-sized cities.

=== Interior ===
Although the vehicle is small, the window is large, so it is a car with open feeling. Air conditioning is not installed. Plastics are widely used for many parts, but doors and handrail are made of stainless steel. The color tone inside the car varies depending on the railway operator.

=== Traction equipments ===
The control system is a chopper control system using a GTO thyristor and drives a direct current motor. The traction motor is body mounted, and the power is transmitted via the Cardan joint and the hypoid gear.

== Operators ==
Locality	Operator	Model Year	Comments
Lille	Lille Metro	1982	
Toulouse	Toulouse Metro	1993	Refurbished in 2011 in 2014.
Paris Orly Airport	Orlyval	1990	
