= Rennes Metro =

Rapid transit system in Rennes, France

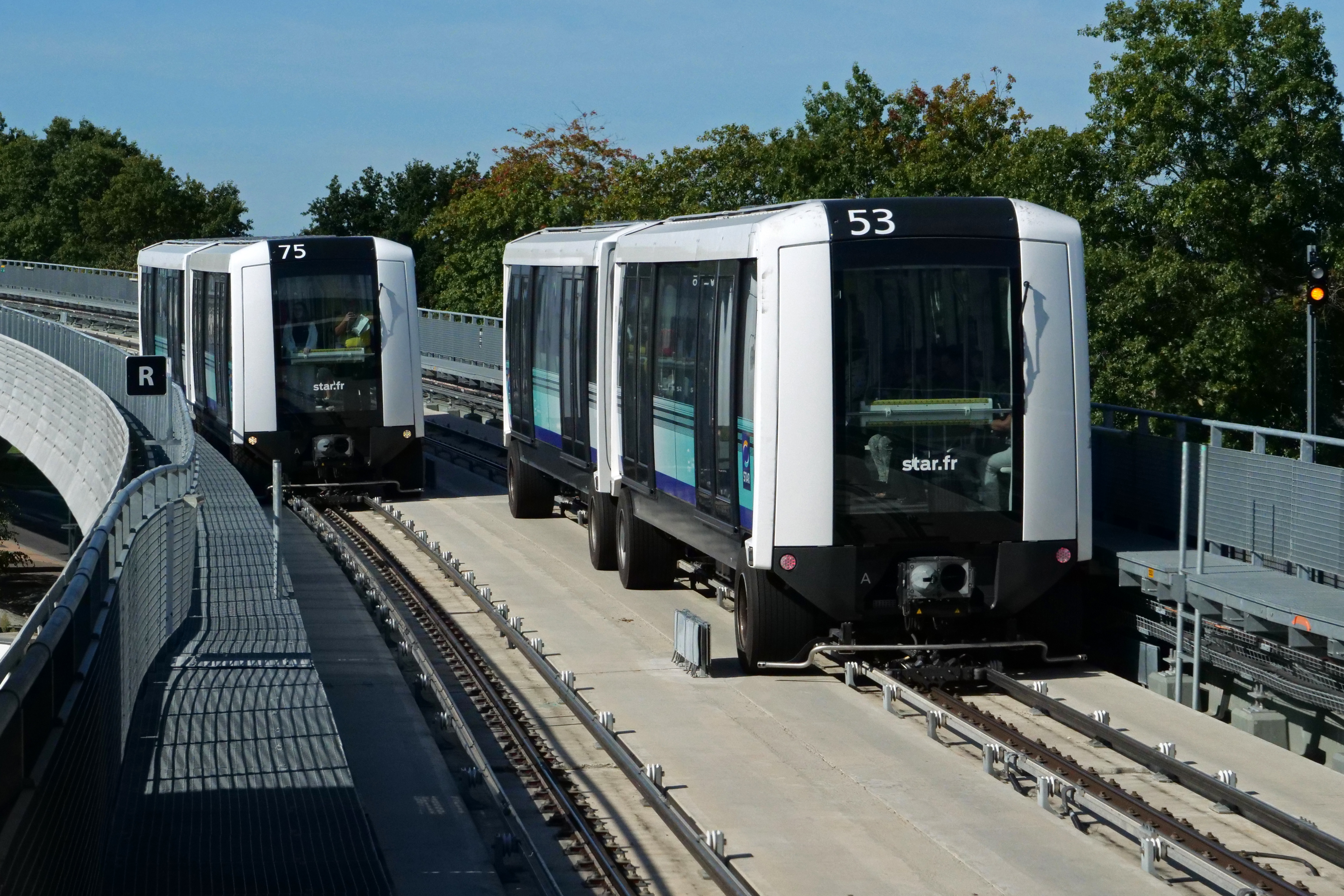

Overview
- Native name: Métro de Rennes (french); Metro Roazhon (breton)
- Owner: Rennes Métropole
- Locale: Rennes, Brittany, France
- Transit type: Rubber-tyred light metro
- Number of lines: 2
- Number of stations: 28
- Daily ridership: Line A: 145,000 (2023); Line B: 80,000 (2023)
- Annual ridership: 42.02 million (2022)
- Headquarters: Rennes
- Website: www.star.fr

Operation
- Began operation: 15 March 2002; 24 years ago
- Operator: Service des Transports en Commun de l'Agglomération Rennaise (STAR)
- Number of vehicles: 55

Technical
- System length: 22.4 km (13.9 mi)
- Track gauge: Rubber-tyred, no conventional track
- Average speed: 32 km/h (20 mph)
- Top speed: 80 km/h (50 mph)
Rennes Métro Network

The Rennes Metro (French: Métro de Rennes; Breton: Metro Roazhon) is a rubber-tyred light metro system serving the city of Rennes in Brittany, France. Opened on 19 March 2002, it made Rennes the smallest city in the world to have a metro system from 2002 to 2008.

The system contains two lines, Line A and B. It has 28 stations and stretches 23.5 kilometres (14.6 mi), with the majority of its route underground. Line A connects Villejean and Poterie, passing the city center. It is based on the Siemens VAL (véhicule automatique léger or light automatic vehicle in English) technology. In 2023, approximately 145,000 trips a day were made on Line A, and 80,000 on Line B.

A second line, Line B, was opened on 20 September 2022. It connects 15 stations, running north-east to south-west between Cesson-Sévigné and Saint-Jacques-de-la-Lande. Two of these stations are interchangeable with Line A, forming an x-shaped network. It is the first metro line in the world to use the NeoVal technology. Originally planned to open in 2020, the line suffered multiple delays, mainly due to the COVID-19 pandemic. After the opening of Line B, Rennes became the smallest city in the world with two metro lines.

== History ==
During the 1960s, Rennes Mayor Henri Fréville discussed the return of the city's tramway system which had been dismantled by his predecessor, Yves Milon. However, the former tramway was disliked due to it being out of tune with the car-centric mentality of the city. When Charles de Gaulle visited Rennes on 31 March 1969, he remarked to Fréville, "When you have a million inhabitants, you can have your metro."

The planning document underpinning urban transport structure (plan de déplacements urbains) in Rennes underwent a redesign which began in September 1984. This redesign was brought about by Mayor Edmond Hervé, who sought to ease congestion and reduce its future risk by remapping the city centre.

Between June and September 1986, SITCAR conducted the first studies considering the creation of a public transport system, separated from road traffic, for Rennes in response to the continued increases in passenger frequency. Several studies were to be conducted considering two different modes of transport: tramway and light railway.

- 1986: City Council decides to create a transport line on a north-western/south-eastern axis.
- 1989: The municipality decides to use VAL technology.
- 1992: The A Line project receives planning and environmental approvals.
- 1997: Beginning of work on Line A.
- 2002: Opening of Line A.
- 2005: Three park-and-ride lots were set up
- 2006: Creation of Korrigo card
- 2007: City Council decides to create a second metro line (B)
- 2010: The municipality decides to use CityVal technology.
- 2011: The B Line project receives planning and environmental approvals.
- 2014: Beginning of work on Line B
- 2022: Opening of Line B

Station		Line(s)	Inauguration Date	Situation	Commune (Neighbourhood)
Anatole France	Anatole France		15 March 2002	Deep Underground	Rennes (La Touche)
Atalante	Atalante		20 September 2022	Overground	Cesson-Sévigné (Campagne Nord / Via Silva)
Beaulieu - Université	Beaulieu - Université		20 September 2022	Overground	Rennes (Beaulieu)
Cesson - Viasilva	Cesson - Viasilva		20 September 2022	Overground	Cesson-Sévigné (Campagne Nord / Via Silva)
Charles de Gaulle	Charles de Gaulle		15 March 2002	Deep Underground	Rennes (Colombier - Champ-de-Mars)
Clemenceau	Clemenceau		15 March 2002	Underground	Rennes (La Binquenais)
Cleunay	Cleunay		20 September 2022	Deep Underground	Rennes (Cleunay)
Colombier	Colombier		20 September 2022	Deep Underground	Rennes (Colombier - Champ-de-Mars)
Gares	Gares		: 15 March 2002 : 20 September 2022	Deep Underground	Rennes (Saint-Hélier)
Gros-Chêne	Gros-Chêne		20 September 2022	Deep Underground	Rennes (Maurepas)
Henri Fréville	Henri Fréville		15 March 2002	Underground	Rennes (Italie)
Italie	Italie		15 March 2002	Underground	Rennes (Italie)
Jacques Cartier	Jacques Cartier		15 March 2002	Deep Underground	Rennes (Villeneuve)
Joliot-Curie - Chateaubriand	Joliot-Curie - Chateaubriand		20 September 2022	Underground	Rennes (Longs-Champs, Jeanne d'Arc)
J.F. Kennedy	J.F. Kennedy		15 March 2002	Underground	Rennes (Villejean)
Jules Ferry	Jules Ferry		20 September 2022	Deep Underground	Rennes (Fougères - Sévigné)
La Courrouze	La Courrouze		20 September 2022	Underground	Saint-Jacques-de-la-Lande (La Courrouze)
La Poterie			15 March 2002	Overground	Rennes (Poterie)
Le Blosne	Le Blosne		15 March 2002	Underground	Rennes (Torigné)
Les Gayeulles	Les Gayeulles		20 September 2022	Underground	Rennes (Maurepas)
Mabilais	Mabilais		20 September 2022	Deep Underground	Rennes (Arsenal-Redon)
Pontchaillou	Pontchaillou		15 March 2002	Overground	Rennes (Villejean)
République	République		15 March 2002	Deep Underground	Rennes (Centre-ville)
Saint-Germain	Saint-Germain		20 September 2022	Deep Underground	Rennes (Centre-ville)
Saint-Jacques - Gaîté	Saint-Jacques - Gaîté		20 September 2022	Underground	Saint-Jacques-de-la-Lande (La Courrouze)
Sainte-Anne	Sainte-Anne		: 15 March 2002 : 20 September 2022	Deep Underground	Rennes (Centre-ville)
Triangle	Triangle		15 March 2002	Underground	Rennes (Torigné)
Villejean - Université	Villejean - Université		15 March 2002	Underground	Rennes (Villejean)

== Line A ==
Station	Line(s)	Inauguration	Situation	District
J.F. Kennedy	(a)	15 March 2002	Underground	Rennes (Villejean)
Villjean-Université	(a)	15 March 2002	Underground	Rennes (Villejean)
Pontchaillou	(a)	15 March 2002	Overground	Rennes (Villejean)
Anatole France	(a)	15 March 2002	Deep Underground	Rennes (La Touche)
Sainte-Anne	(a)(b)	15 March 2002	Deep Underground	Rennes (Centre-ville)
République	(a)	15 March 2002	Deep Underground	Rennes (Centre-ville)
Charles de Gaulle	(a)	15 March 2002	Deep Underground	Rennes (Colombier - Champ-de-Mars)
Gares	(a)(b) (TER)(TGV)	15 March 2002	Deep Underground	Rennes (Saint-Hélier)
Jacques Cartier	(a)	15 March 2002	Deep Underground	Rennes (Villeneuve)
Clemenceau	(a)	15 March 2002	Underground	Rennes (La Binquenais)
Henri Fréville	(a)	15 March 2002	Underground	Rennes (Italie)
Italie	(a)	15 March 2002	Underground	Rennes (Italie)
Triangle	(a)	15 March 2002	Underground	Rennes (Torigné)
Le Blosne	(a)	15 March 2002	Underground	Rennes (Torigné)
La Poterie	(a)	15 March 2002	Overground	Rennes (Poterie)

Rennes metro line A map.

Opened on 15 March 2002, Line A is based on the Siemens VAL (véhicule automatique léger or light automatic vehicle) technology. The 9.4-kilometre (5.8 mi) Line A runs roughly northwest to southeast from J.F. Kennedy to La Poterie via Gare de Rennes (served by Gares metro station), with fifteen stations (thirteen of which are underground).

Services run between 05:20 and 00:40 each day (except Thursday, Friday and Saturday between 05:20 and 01:35), and with a waiting time of approximately 80 seconds between trains. From end to end, it takes around 16 minutes, with an average train speed of 32 km/h (20 mph). All stations are equipped with platform screen doors and lifts.

The system has 30 trains, each weighing 28 tonnes (27.6 long tons; 30.9 short tons) and 26 metres (85 ft 3 5/8 in) long, with a capacity of 170 passengers.

In January 2005, three park-and-ride lots were set up, offering 900 places to motorists. Two more opened in 2006–2007, able to accommodate an additional 700 vehicles.

On 1 March 2006, a card called KorriGo was created as a supplement to the ticket system to improve the metro traffic and the city's bus network.

The line is maintained by Service des Transports en Commun de l'Agglomération Rennaise (STAR), and managed by Keolis. It has a staff of approximately 100. It is operated from a control centre (poste de commande centralisée) situated in Chantepie. 120 cameras monitor the stations.

The station at La Poterie and viaducts on the line were designed by Foster + Partners.

With a population of just 205,000 inhabitants for city proper (in 2002), Rennes was the smallest city in the world to boast a metro until 2008 (when Lausanne Metro opened). However, in 2013, 425,000 people (211 000 in Rennes) are served by the network in 43 municipalities. On average, there are 135,000 metro trips each day; this figure is expected to rise to 180,000 in coming years, leading to possible gridlock during the rush hours.

=== Stations ===
The station names have been chosen for the nearest existing streets or for points of interest near the station locations.

- J.F. Kennedy (former US President)
- Villejean-Université: University of Rennes 1 and University of Rennes 2
- Pontchaillou (elevated): Teaching hospital
- Anatole France (French poet and journalist)
- Sainte-Anne (French queen and Duchess of Brittany): city-center
- République: city-center
- Charles de Gaulle (former French President): city-center
- Gares (SNCF interchange): city-center
- Jacques Cartier (French navigator and explorer)
- Clemenceau (World War I French Prime Minister)
- Henri Fréville (former mayor of Rennes)
- Italie
- Triangle
- Blosne
- La Poterie (elevated)

Station signage is in French and Gallo at Charles de Gaulle station and French and Breton at Gares station.

=== Gallery ===
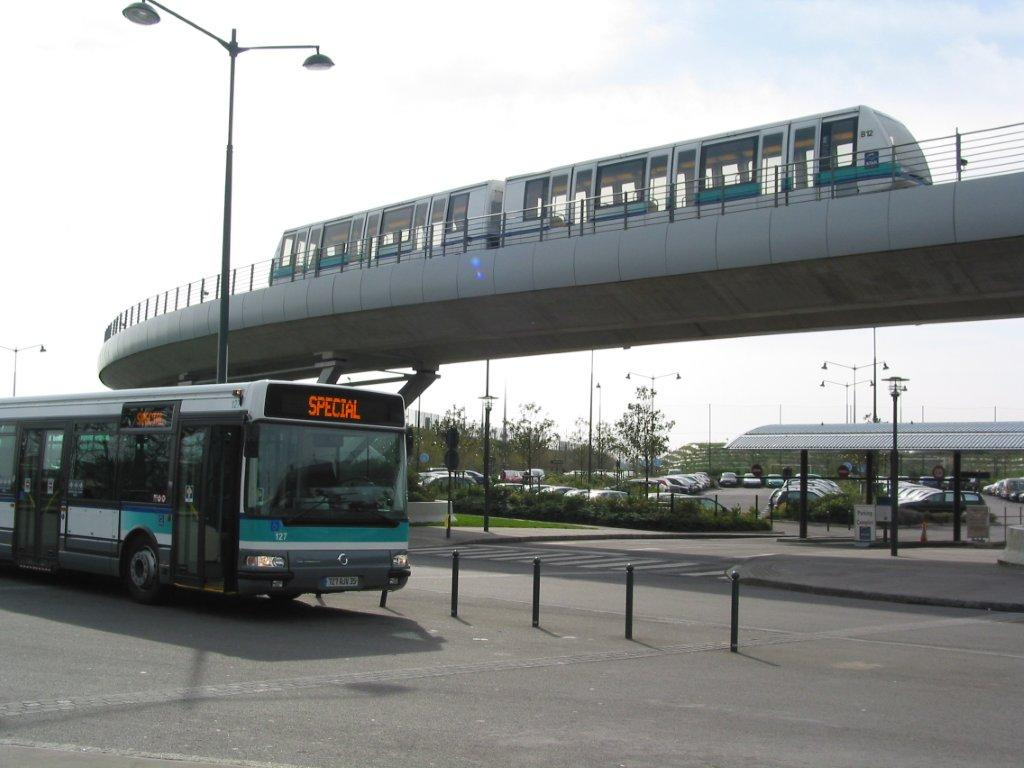
An elevated section of Metro

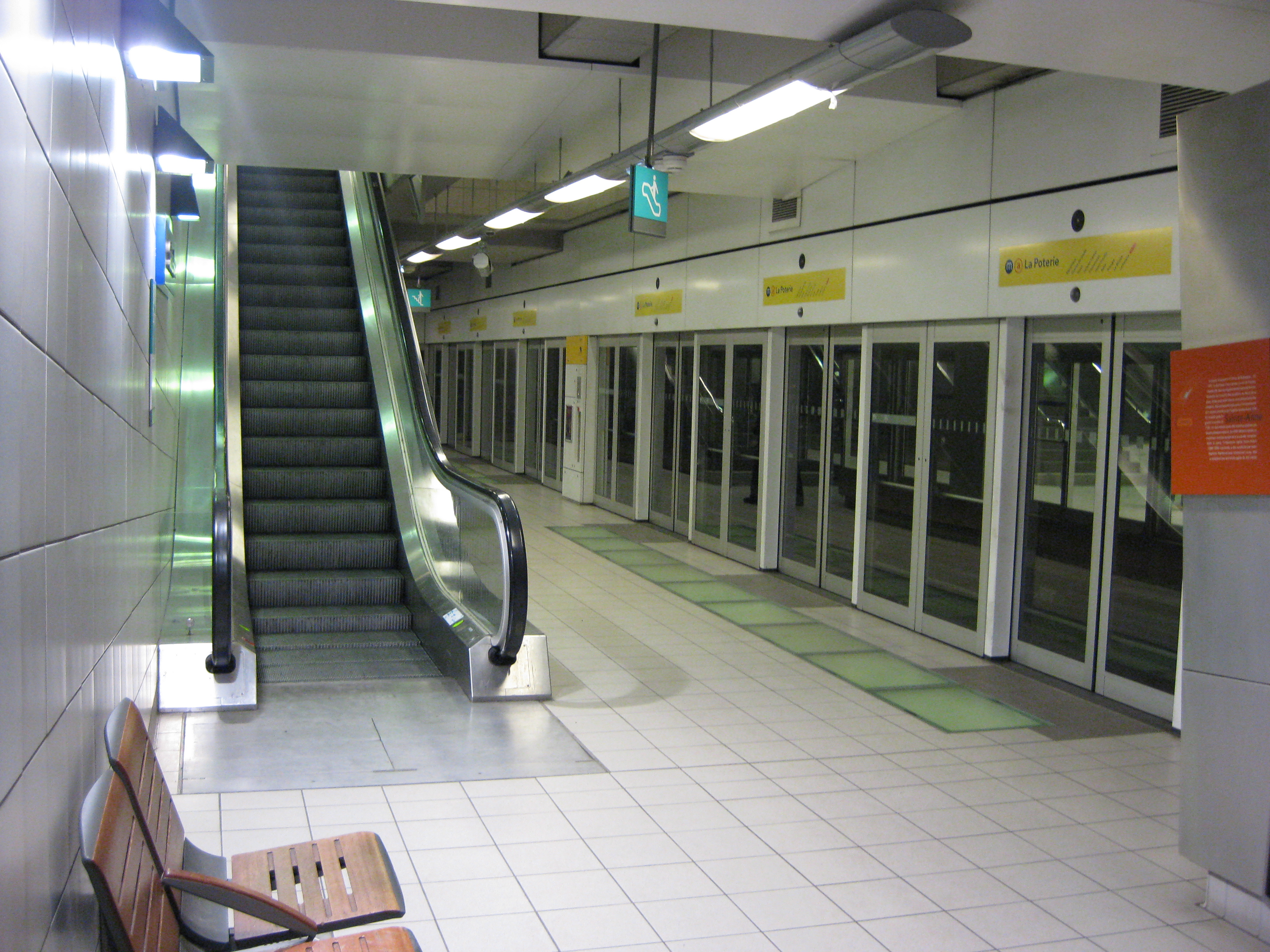
The subsurface station, Sainte-Anne Quais

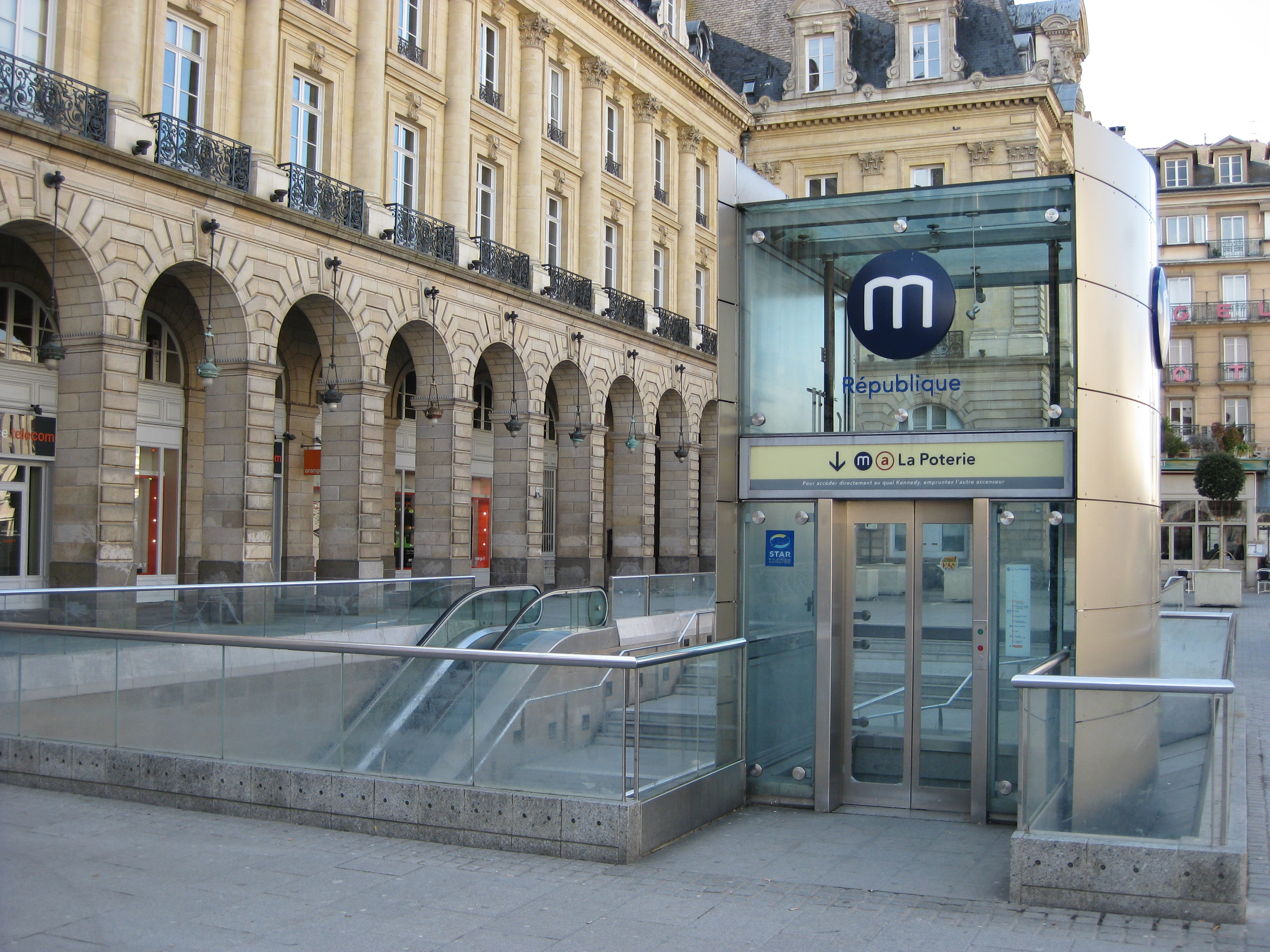
République station

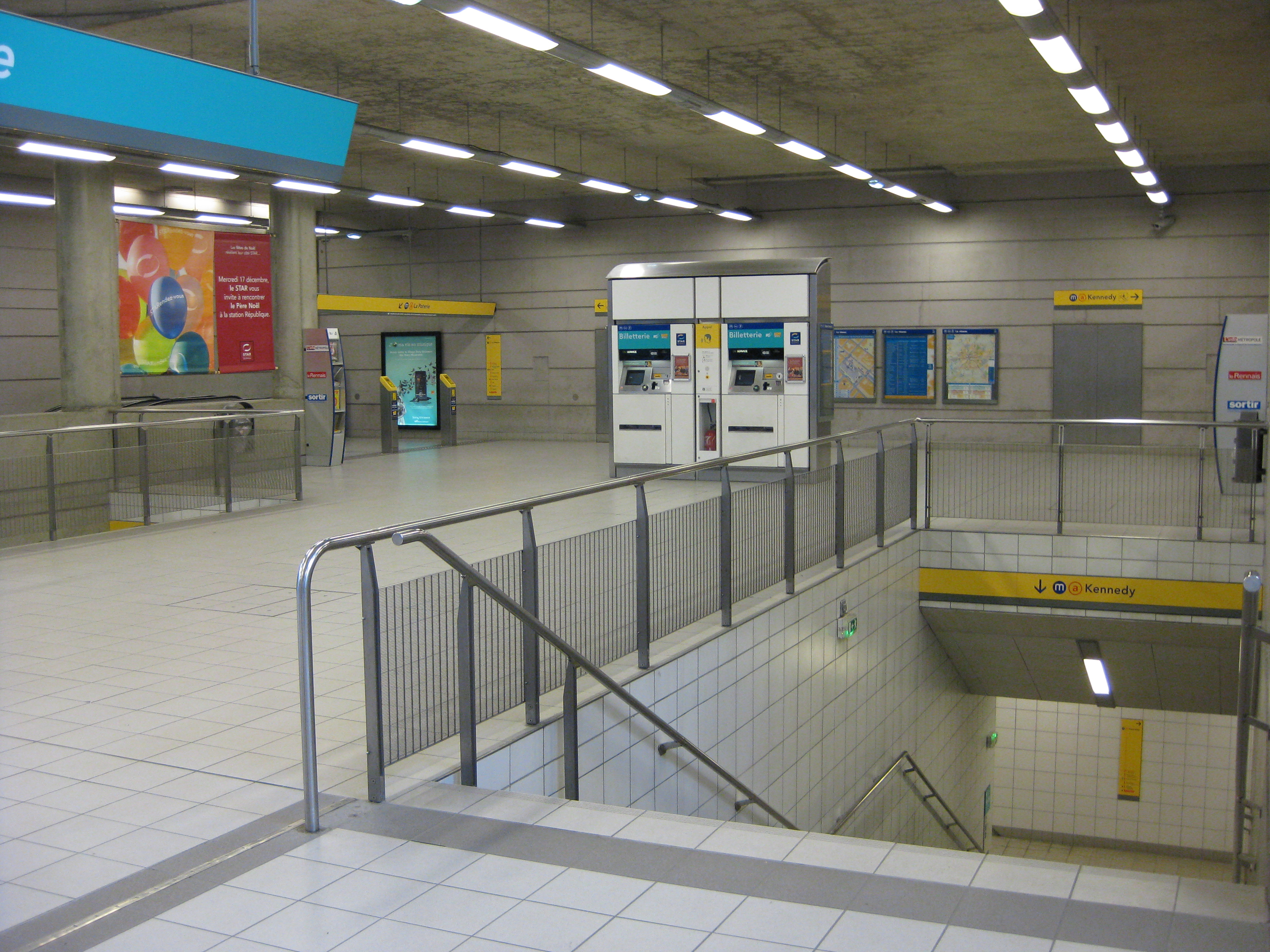
République station

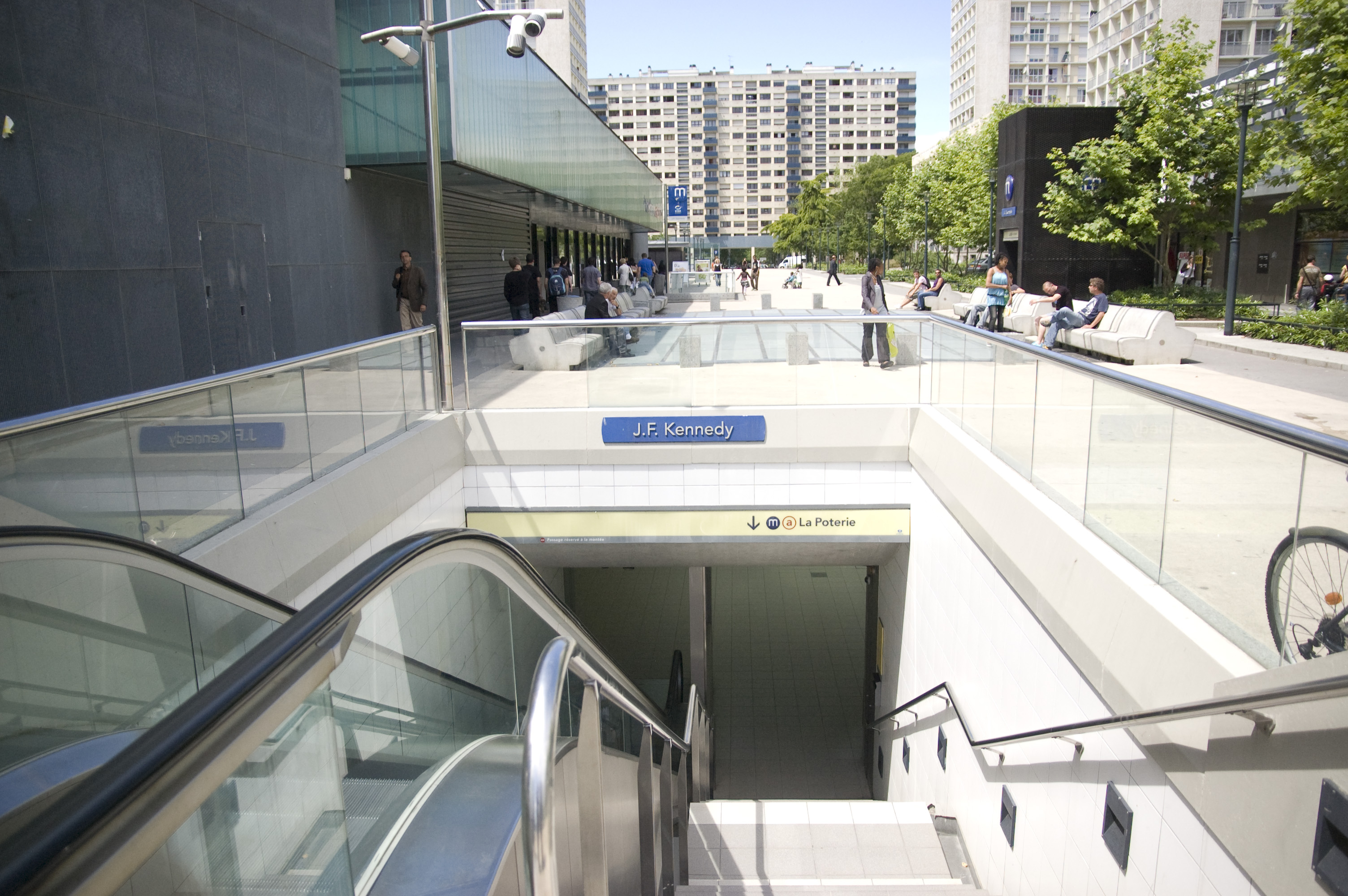
Kennedy station

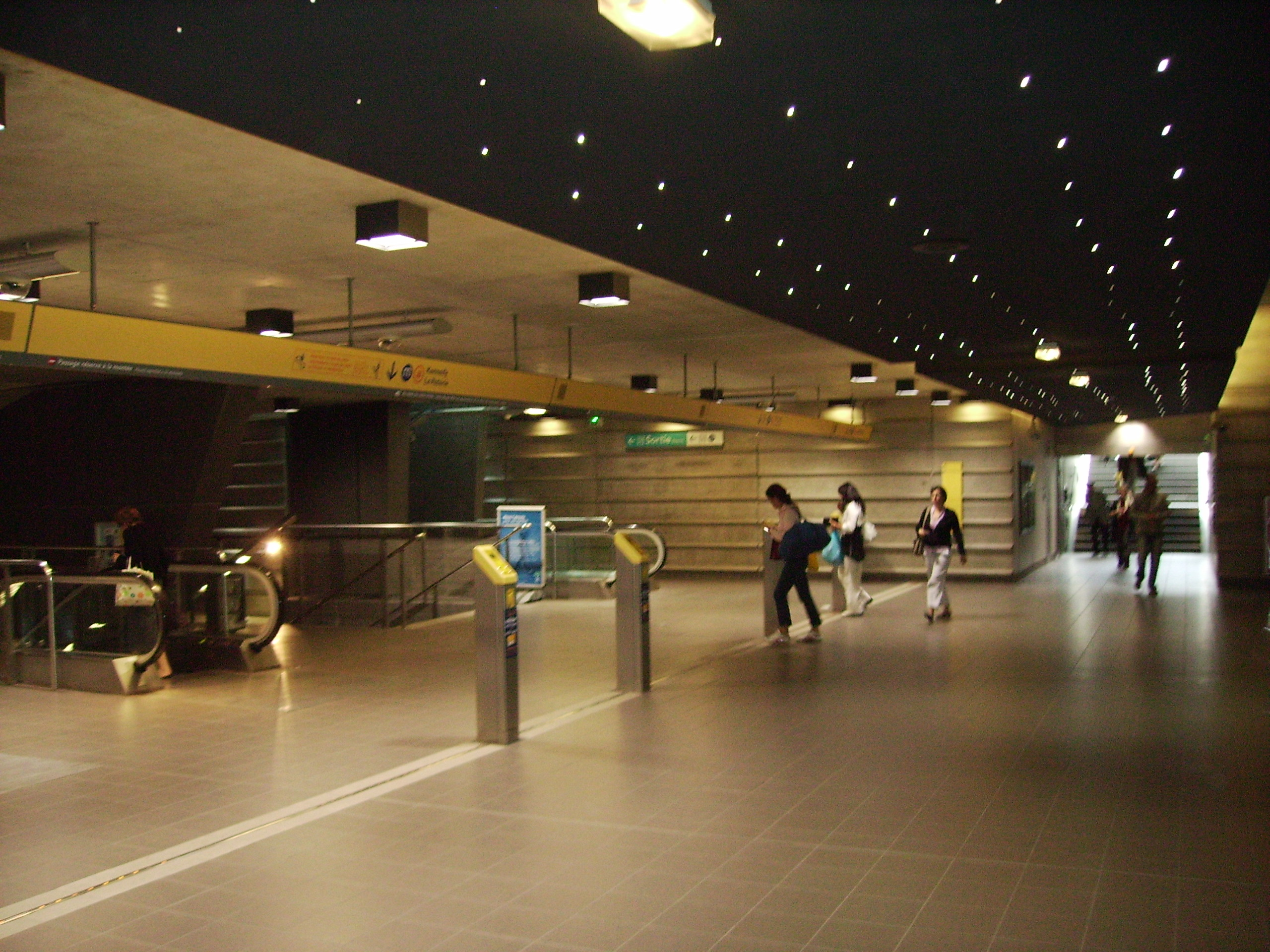
Charles de Gaulle station

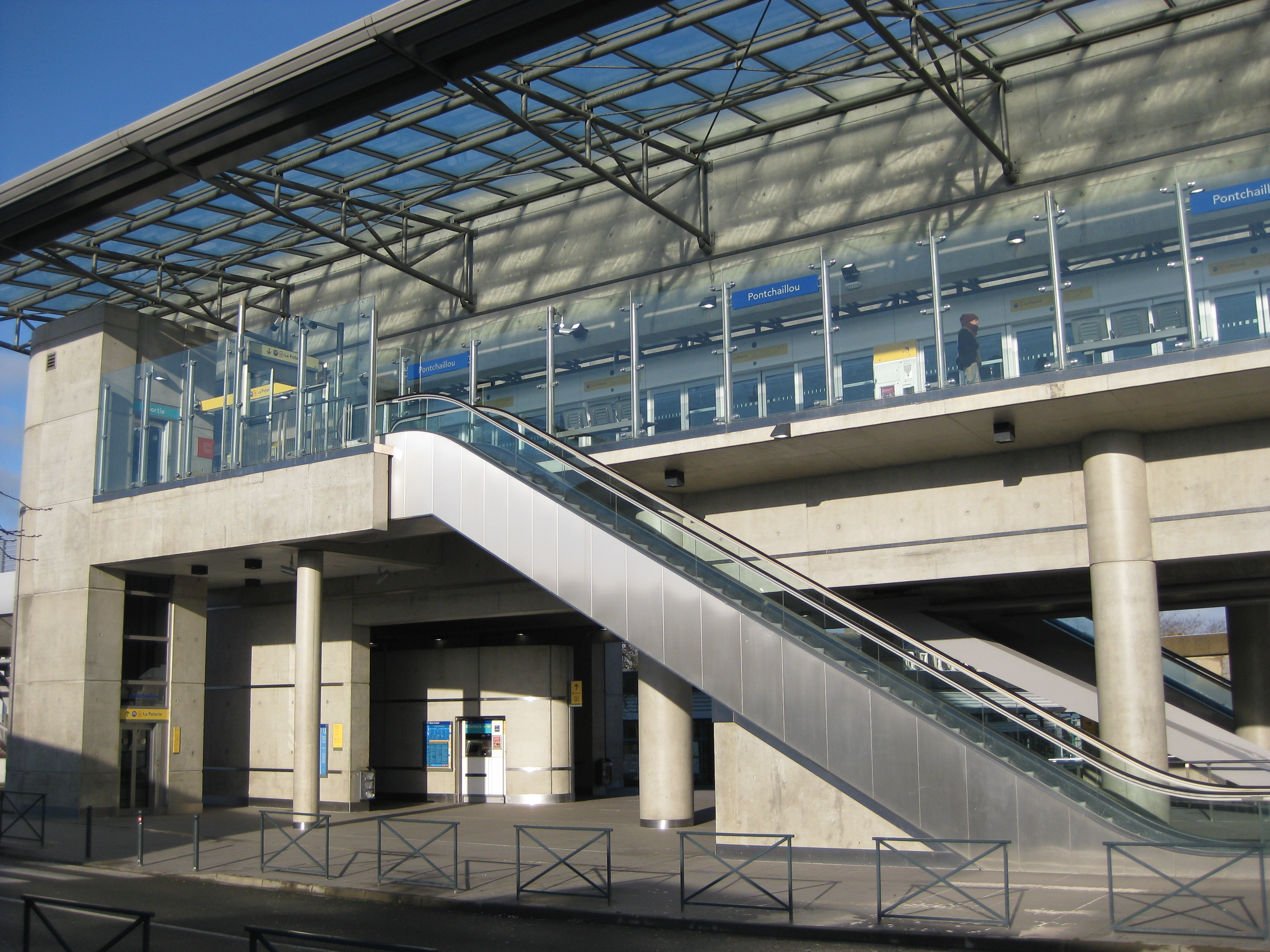
Pontchaillou station

== Line B ==
Rennes metro line B map.

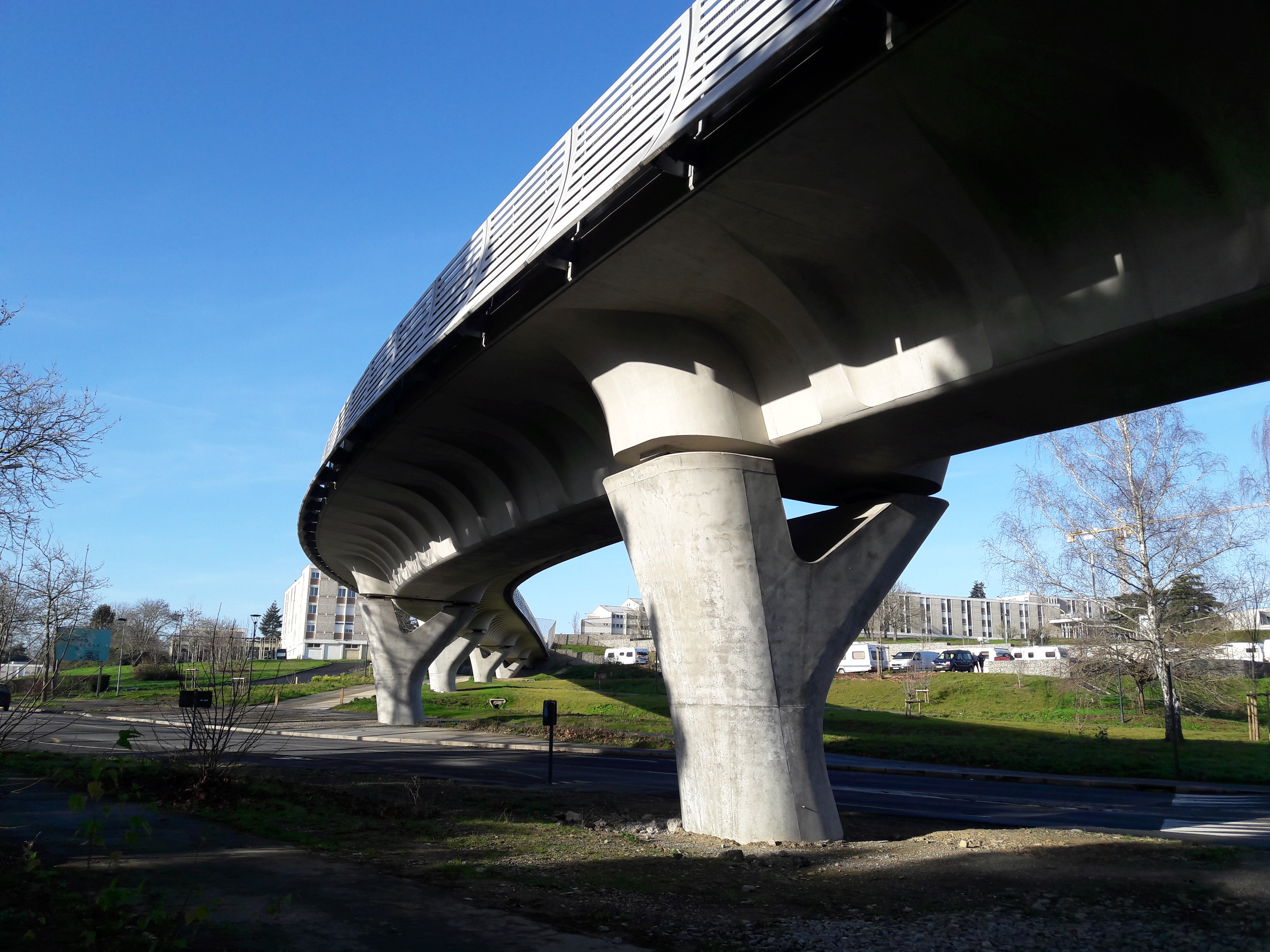
Line B viaduct

Opened on 20 September 2022, Line B is based on the new NeoVal technology. The line runs 13.4 kilometres (8.3 mi) north-east to south-west between Cesson - Viasilva and Saint-Jacques - Gaîté with 15 stations (12 of which underground). The line connects with Line A at two stations, Sainte-Anne and Gare, and two other stations, Saint-Germain and Colombier, are within walking distance to Line A.

The two terminal stations, Saint-Jacques - Gaîté and Cesson - Viasilva, as well as Les Gayeulles are served by the Parc relais (ride-and-park service) operated by STAR.

The north-eastern end of the line is served via a viaduct nearly 2.4 kilometres (1.5 mi) long. The viaduct is held up by 70 piers, with its average height between the bottom of its deck and the ground 6 to 7 metres (19 ft 8 in to 23 ft 0 in), and the tallest pier 9.35 metres (30 ft 8 in) tall. The viaduct serves three stations: Cesson - Viasilva, Atlante, and Beaulieu - Université. At the end of the viaduct on the "Beaulieu - Université" station side, the line goes underground via an opening on the ground next to the parking lots of the university residence.

With the new line about to be open, the operator of Rennes' public transport system, Service des Transports en Commun de l'Agglomération Rennaise (STAR) announced changes for the bus network, scheduled to take effect on 24 October, a month after the line's opening. In addition, bus line C3, currently having the same shade of green as Line B, will change its colour to yellow.

To promote the newly opening line, STAR announced that the entire Line B would be free during the first week of operation, through Sunday 25 September. In addition, there will also be various celebration activities held at five stations: Saint-Jacques - Gaîté, La Courrouze, Cleunay, Gros-Chêne, and Cesson - Viasilva, as well as exhibitions of the new metro at Sainte-Anne station.

On opening day both lines of the metro network saw record-breaking daily ridership, with 155,000 riderships on Line A and 120,000 riderships on Line B, and an estimated 10% of the riderships transferring between the two lines. The two transfer stations, "Sainte-Anne" and "Gares", also saw the highest daily ridership of 23,000 and 15,000. The operator STAR have expected a daily ridership of 110,000 in the long term.

=== Stations ===
- Saint-Jacques - Gaîté
- La Courrouze
- Cleunay
- Mabilais (4th tallest building in Rennes, Le Mabilay)
- Colombier: city-center
- Gares : city-center
- Saint-Germain (Saint-Germain Church): city-center
- Sainte-Anne: city-center
- Jules Ferry (French statesman and republican philosopher)
- Gros-Chêne
- Les Gayeulles (Park of Gayeulles)
- Joliot-Curie - Chateaubriand (lycée Joliot-Curie and lycée Chateaubriand)
- Beaulieu - Université (University of Rennes 1, Institut national des sciences appliquées de Rennes, and École nationale supérieure de chimie de Rennes)
- Atalante (technopole of Rennes Atlante)
- Cesson - Viasilva

== Social, economic and cultural impacts ==
=== Urban opening-up and redevelopment ===
The Rennes Metro helps to open up peripheral districts such as Maurepas, Gros-Chêne and Les Gayeulles, as well as the north-eastern quarter of the metropolis, thanks to reduced journey times: the first line put one in two Rennes residents within 600 m or a 10-minute walk of a metro station; the opening of the second line brings this number to three in four. Thus, the journey time between Cleunay and Beaulieu has been reduced from 40 to 20 minutes and no longer requires taking two different buses; that between the suburban commune of Betton and the Mabilais district has been reduced from 60 minutes, taking two different buses, to 35 to 40 minutes by combining the metro and metropolitan bus lines. These reduced journey times are accompanied by an increase in the use of public transport with a growth of 9% in most of the municipalities of the metropolis, 4% in Acigné, 21% in Cesson-Sévigné, Rennes and Saint-Jacques-de-la-Lande, 22% in Bruz and even 68% in Chevaigné in 2023 compared to 2019. The metro adds to the "archipelago" urbanization of the agglomeration which avoids urban sprawl and encourages the use of transport, which is higher than in the Nantes agglomeration.

== See also ==
- List of metro systems
