= Porte des Postes (Lille Metro) =

Coordinates: 50.6184°N 3.0501°E

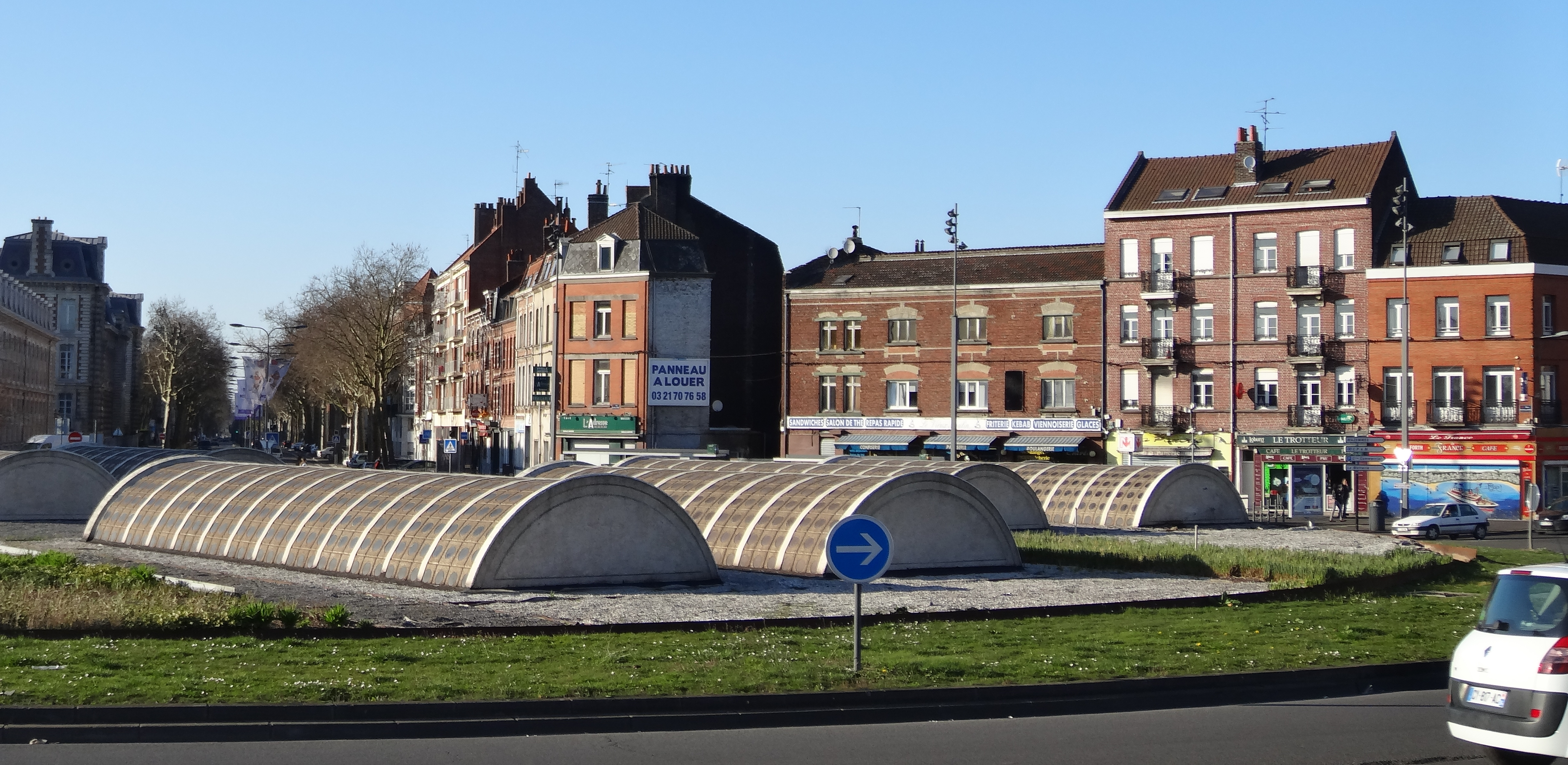

The station Porte des Postes is a station on lines 1 and 2 of the Lille Metro, located in Lille. Opened on 2 May 1984, it is located at the site the former site of the 'Porte de Postes'.

== The station ==
=== Location ===
The Porte des Postes station is one of just two metro stations in Lille (the other being the Gare Lille-Flandres station) that allow interchange between the two lines. The station is located just below the Place des Porte des Postes and at exit 3 of the A25 motorway, which is part of the Lille ring road. It serves the district of Wazemmes, where it is located, as well as the neighborhoods of Moulins and Faubourg de Béthune.

The route of the metro on line 2 between this station and the station Porte de Valenciennes runs along the route of the ancient walls built in the 17th century (now replaced by boulevards). Each station is located near the site of an old city gate and took the gate's name (Hence Porte Des Postes because porte means gate in this context). It is located on line 1 between Wazemmes station and CHU Center Oscar-Lambret and on line 2 between the stations Montebello and Porte d'Arras.

The only tunnel connecting the two lines of the metro is located at this station, but it is only used for maintenance operations or train exchanges between the different workshops of the two lines. This tunnel also serves as a siding, allowing for extra/less trains if the need arises.

In the station you can find a Customer Services Area, where you can see maps of all bus lines in the network, and a Transpole employee is available to inform travelers.

=== Origin of the name ===
The station's name come from the former 'Porte des Postes'. It was a city gate destroyed in the 1930s during the destruction of part of the wall.

=== History and developments ===
The station was opened on May 2, 1984, during the extension to CHR B-Calmette and in April 1989 the station was complemented with a second line at the inauguration of the line 1 between the stations Saint-Philibert and Gares (now called Gare Lille-Flandres), making it just one of two multi-line stations in Lille.

The platforms of line 1 were lengthened to reach 52 meters to accommodate four-car trains. It was equipped with a new access point to boulevard Victor-Hugo.

On March 11, 2017, an accident caused by a motorist caused the collapse of a portion of the roof of the station causing no injuries.
