= Line 1 (Lille Metro) =

Metro line in Lille, France, connecting Villeneuve-d'Ascq to CHU - Eurasanté

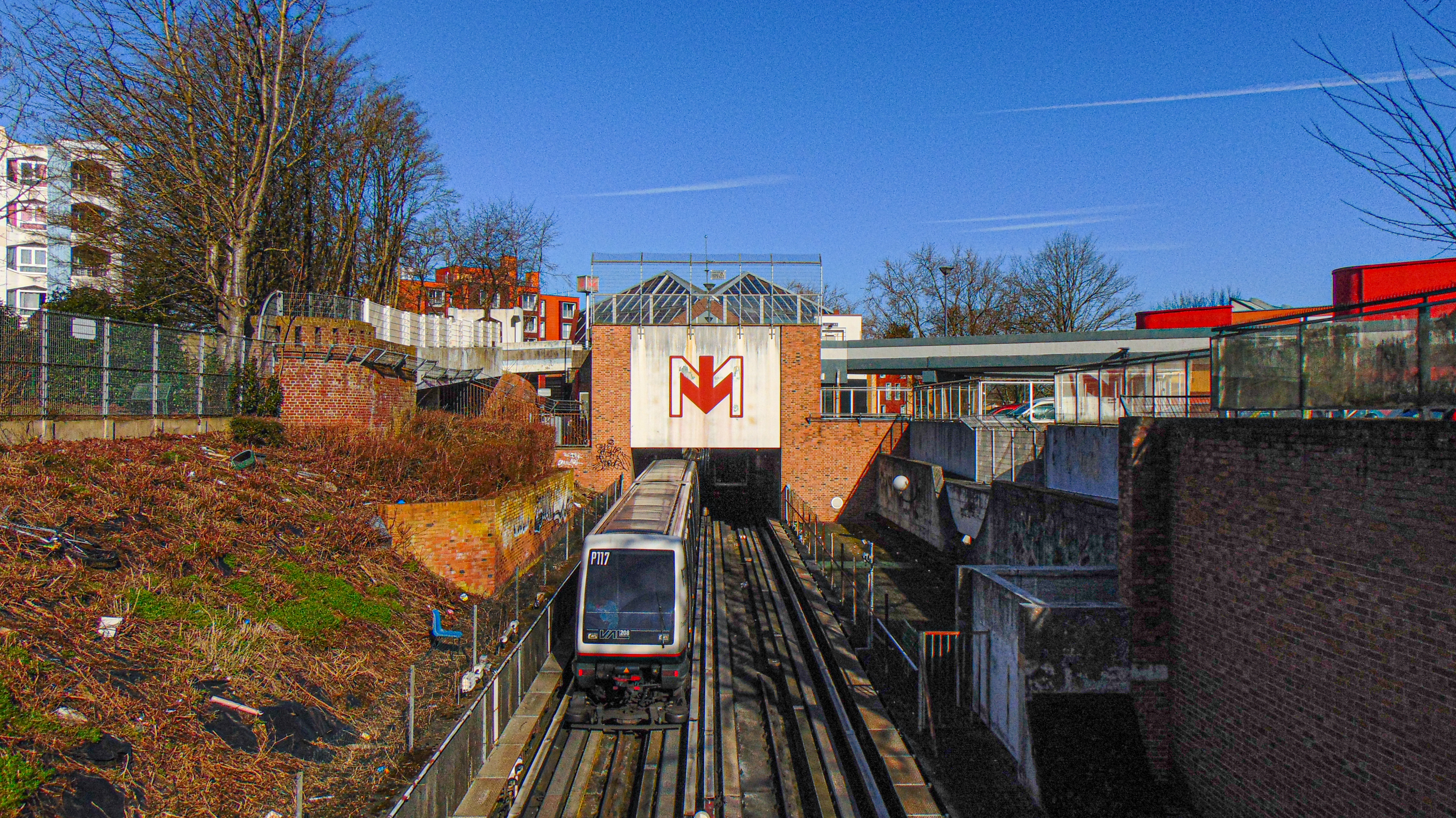
- A VAL 208 train departs Triolo station in Villeneuve-d'Ascq.

Overview
- Status: Operational
- Owner: Métropole Européenne de Lille
- Locale: Lille Métropole, France
- Termini: Quatre Cantons–Stade Pierre-Mauroy; CHU–Eurasanté
- Stations: 18

Service
- Type: Rapid transit
- System: Lille Metro
- Operator: Ilévia

History
- Opened: 25 April 1983
- Last extension: 2 May 1984

Technical
- Line length: 12.542 km (7.793 mi)
- Character: Underground, elevated, and at-grade
- Electrification: 750 V DC third rail
- Operating speed: 80 km/h (50 mph)

Line 1 of the Lille Metro is one of two lines serving the Lille metropolitan area in northern France. Spanning the cities of Villeneuve-d'Ascq and Lille, it connects Quatre Cantons–Stade Pierre-Mauroy in the east to CHU–Eurasanté in the west.

Conceived in the 1960s as part of Lille's decentralization efforts, Line 1 was inaugurated on April 25, 1983, initially linking Quatre Cantons to République. The line reached its current extent on May 2, 1984, with the extension to CHU–Eurasanté (then CHR B-Calmette). It holds the distinction of being the world's first metro line to implement the Véhicule Automatique Léger (VAL) technology, developed at the University of Lille in the 1970s—originally dubbed "Villeneuve-d'Ascq – Lille" (VAL). Since its debut, the line has proven immensely popular, handling 165,000 daily trips by 2013.

Stretching 12.5 kilometers (7.8 miles), with 9 kilometers (5.6 miles) underground, Line 1 comprises 18 stations. Initially equipped with VAL 206 trains, these were largely replaced by VAL 208 models starting in 2008. On November 17, 2024—after nearly 41 years of service with the original VAL automation—Line 1 transitioned to Alstom's modern Urbalis Fluence system, now exclusively operating VAL 208 trains as part of an ongoing modernization effort.

== History ==
=== Linking Lille and Villeneuve-d'Ascq ===
In the 1960s, Lille faced urban challenges: a congested city center overwhelmed by cars and buses, contrasted with poorly connected suburban areas. To address this, planners envisioned decentralizing parts of the city, leading to the creation of the Lille-Est Public Development Establishment (EPALE) in 1968. EPALE aimed to develop a new town near Lille, but site selection was proved complex due to limestone quarries that would inflate construction costs.

Professor Robert Gabillard and his team at the Faculty of Sciences offered a solution. Leveraging their expertise in telecommunications and electromagnetic propagation, they devised an electromagnetic mapping tool to identify suitable locations, ultimately settling on Villeneuve-d'Ascq. Pleased with this collaboration, EPALE and the Communauté Urbaine de Lille (CUDL) tasked Gabillard with designing a rapid, high-frequency transit system to further integrate the region. His research culminated in 1971 with the patent for the VAL system ("Villeneuve-d'Ascq – Lille"), an automated metro.

In 1974, EPALE, with the support of Arthur Notebart, President of the CUDL, presented a project for the development of public transport in the Lille metropolitan area, including four metro lines. The first line was a priority for the CUDL, as it would link Villeneuve-d'Ascq to Lille, much to the dismay of the elected representatives of Roubaix and Tourcoing and the Chamber of Commerce, who wanted to make the Lille-Roubaix-Tourcoing axis "the real spine of the metropolis". The consequence of this ambitious project was a sharp increase in the projected budget, from 230 million to 875 million francs.

Despite the 1976 decree declaring the work on line 1 to be in the public interest, the CUDL saw the start of work on the metro delayed by the Secretary of State for Transport, who refused to validate the concession signed by the CUDL for construction. As a result, the urban community decided to take charge of the metro works itself and released the necessary funds.

=== Construction, Opening, and Expansion ===
Construction began in 1977, with Matra building the Quatre Cantons depot in Villeneuve-d'Ascq. By late 1978, SOFRETU deployed 35 engineers to oversee underground work between Pont de Bois and Porte des Postes. The first segment, from Cité Scientifique to the depot (doubling as the control center), was completed in September 1979, hosting initial trains without full automation. This section, between the Cité Scientifique station and the garage-workshop that also serves as the central control station (PCC), saw the first trains with the equipment but without the automated systems.

For the rest of the line, viaducts are preferred in areas with little or moderate urban development. Viaducts are the least expensive sections (cut-and-cover and underground sections cost 1.7 and 3.4 times more respectively). However, residents of the Triolo district of Villeneuve-d'Ascq, concerned about their environment, demanded and obtained the passage of the metro through their district in an open cut instead of a viaduct. In Mons-en-Barœul, the switch from a viaduct to an underground route was mentioned for a time during a neighborhood survey in 1974 concerning the first line, but the following year, the CUDL decided to remove the town from the line's route, thus reducing costs and allowing the metro to be built underground.

Construction of the Villeneuve-d'Ascq viaduct began in January 1979 and was completed in February 1980. The 1.225-kilometer viaduct is made up of nine independent sections ranging from 110 to 170 meters in length. The construction of the viaduct was primarily the subject of studies into the noise, vibrations and electromagnetic disturbances that could be caused by the automatic metro.

Cut-and-cover work involved the long section between the future Hôtel de Ville and Fives stations. Both open and cut-and-cover operations caused considerable disruption to local traffic, which was nevertheless maintained thanks to a number of techniques. After earthworks on the relevant lanes, the traffic gallery was put into operation. In addition to the work directly concerning the trench, related work was required to adapt the roadways and build crossing structures. The stations, which are built separately from the line, were constructed using the trenching method.

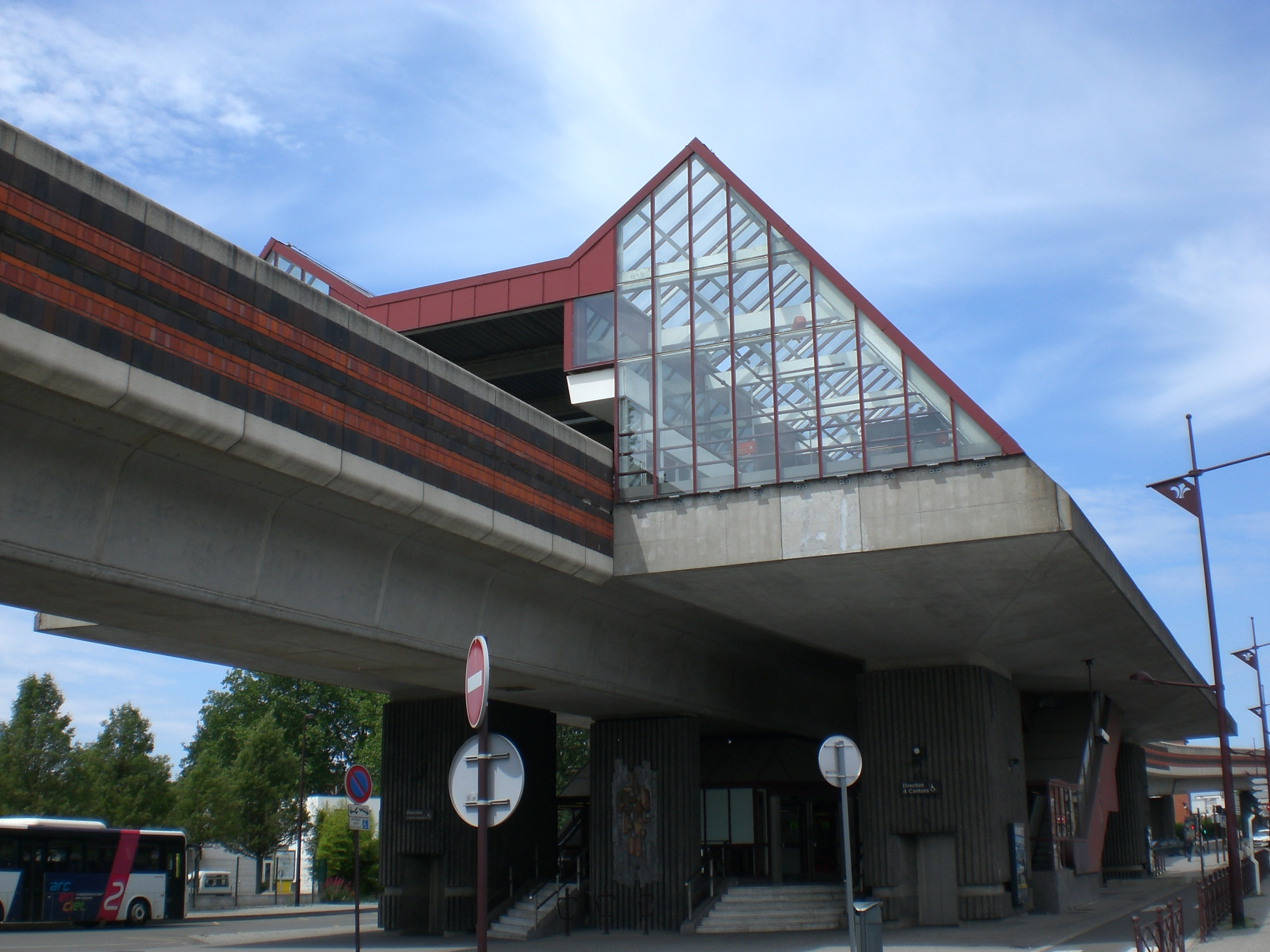
The CHU–Centre Oscar-Lambret station, part of the segment still under construction at the 1983 opening.

Deep tunnels, the costliest option, were essential in dense urban zones like central Lille. Dug just below the water table, the tunnel required 11 access points and employed 160 workers. Line 1 officially opened on April 25, 1983—the world's first VAL metro and fully accessible to people with disabilities. President François Mitterrand arrived by helicopter at Quatre Cantons, greeted by Notebart, Villeneuve-d'Ascq mayor Gérard Caudron, Gabillard, and CUDL transport director Bernard Guilleminot. After touring Gare Lille-Flandres, he unveiled a plaque at République.

Although the line was inaugurated in April 1983, it was only partially accessible between Quatre Cantons and République, whereas the CUDL had planned a western terminus as far as CHR B-Calmette station in the 1970s. Work was still underway on the section between République and CHR B-Calmette station, mainly involving track laying and station layout. This section, which passes through the Wazemmes district and Lille's regional hospital, went into service on May 2, 1984. Line 1, designed by the CUDL in the 1970s, was therefore fully operational by this date.

== Route and Stations ==
=== Route ===
Geographically accurate map of Line 1 from Quatre Cantons to CHU–Eurasanté.

The 12.542-kilometer Line 1 runs from Quatre Cantons–Stade Pierre-Mauroy to CHU–Eurasanté, with 8.922 kilometers (71%) operating underground in tunnel sections. The remaining route consists of elevated viaducts and surface-level segments. Stations are spaced an average of 722 meters apart.

The line originates at the Quatre Cantons depot in Villeneuve-d'Ascq, which serves as both a train storage facility and maintenance center. From this northern terminus, the initial open-trench section runs north to Quatre Cantons–Stade Pierre-Mauroy station. The alignment then transitions to a 1,225-meter elevated viaduct spanning Avenue Poincaré and Avenue Jean-Perrin, providing service to the University of Lille's scientific campus. The viaduct terminates at Cité Scientifique–Professeur Gabillard station, located near the university library. After crossing Boulevard de Tournai, the line returns to an open-trench configuration through Villeneuve-d'Ascq's Triolo district, where it serves Triolo station.

After serving the Triolo district and crossing the RN 227 road, the line turns westward and transitions into a covered trench before splitting to reach Villeneuve-d'Ascq–Hôtel de Ville station. This station has a unique layout compared to others on the line, featuring a central platform with tracks on either side (most stations have a central track flanked by two side platforms). Beyond the station, the trench merges back into a two-track alignment and continues underground beneath the Pont-de-Bois district, where it serves the eponymous station. Pont de Bois station provides connections to the regional rail network via an adjacent railway halt.

Still in a cut-and-cover configuration, the line then enters Hellemmes, following the northwestward trajectory of Rue Roger-Salengro, the municipality's main thoroughfare. Two stations are located along this section: Square Flandres and Mairie d'Hellemmes.

After passing through Villeneuve-d'Ascq and Hellemmes, the line enters Lille beneath Rue Pierre-Legrand, still in a covered trench. The first two stations serving Lille proper are Marbrerie and Fives. Beyond Fives station, the alignment transitions into a deep tunnel, following Rue de Bouvines to reach Madeleine Caulier station, built beneath its namesake square.

The following table lists video clips of interstations along Line 1:

Interstation Segment	Video
Quatre Cantons–Stade Pierre-Mauroy ↔ Cité Scientifique–Professeur Gabillard	
Cité Scientifique–Professeur Gabillard ↔ Triolo	
Triolo ↔ Villeneuve-d'Ascq–Hôtel de Ville	
Villeneuve-d'Ascq–Hôtel de Ville ↔ Pont de Bois	
Pont de Bois ↔ Square Flandres	
Square Flandres ↔ Mairie d'Hellemmes	
Mairie d'Hellemmes ↔ Marbrerie	
Marbrerie ↔ Fives	
Fives ↔ Madeleine Caulier	
Madeleine Caulier ↔ Gare Lille-Flandres	
Gare Lille-Flandres ↔ Rihour	
Rihour ↔ République–Beaux-Arts	
République–Beaux-Arts ↔ Gambetta	
Gambetta ↔ Wazemmes	
Wazemmes ↔ Porte des Postes	
Porte des Postes ↔ CHU–Centre Oscar-Lambret	
CHU–Centre Oscar-Lambret ↔ CHU–Eurasanté	

The line then turns southwest through central Lille, passing beneath Rue Faidherbe, Rue des Manneliers, and the Grand'Place before reaching Place Rihour, where Rihour station is situated. It continues to Place de la République, serving République–Beaux-Arts station, then follows Rue d'Inkermann, Rue Colbrant, and Rue de Flandre to reach the Wazemmes district, stopping at Gambetta station. After a short inter-station segment, it arrives at Wazemmes station.

The alignment proceeds beneath Rue des Postes and Place Barthélémy Dorez, where the interchange station Porte des Postes is located. The line then emerges to ground level, runs alongside the A25 motorway in an open trench, and ascends onto a viaduct to serve the Lille University Hospital Center (CHU) at CHU–Centre Oscar-Lambret station before terminating at CHU–Eurasanté station.

=== Stations ===
Lille Metro Line 1 spans 13.5 km, serving 18 stations from CHU–Eurasanté in southwestern Lille to Quatre Cantons–Stade Pierre-Mauroy in Villeneuve-d'Ascq. The line opened on April 25, 1983, with 15 stations, extended to Pont de Bois on May 18, 1984, and reached its current eastern terminus on February 3, 1989. It connects the municipalities of Lille, Mons-en-Barœul, and Villeneuve-d'Ascq, offering links to Lille Metro Line 2, Ilévia buses, and SNCF rail services, alongside major cultural, educational, and commercial destinations.

=== Renamed Stations ===
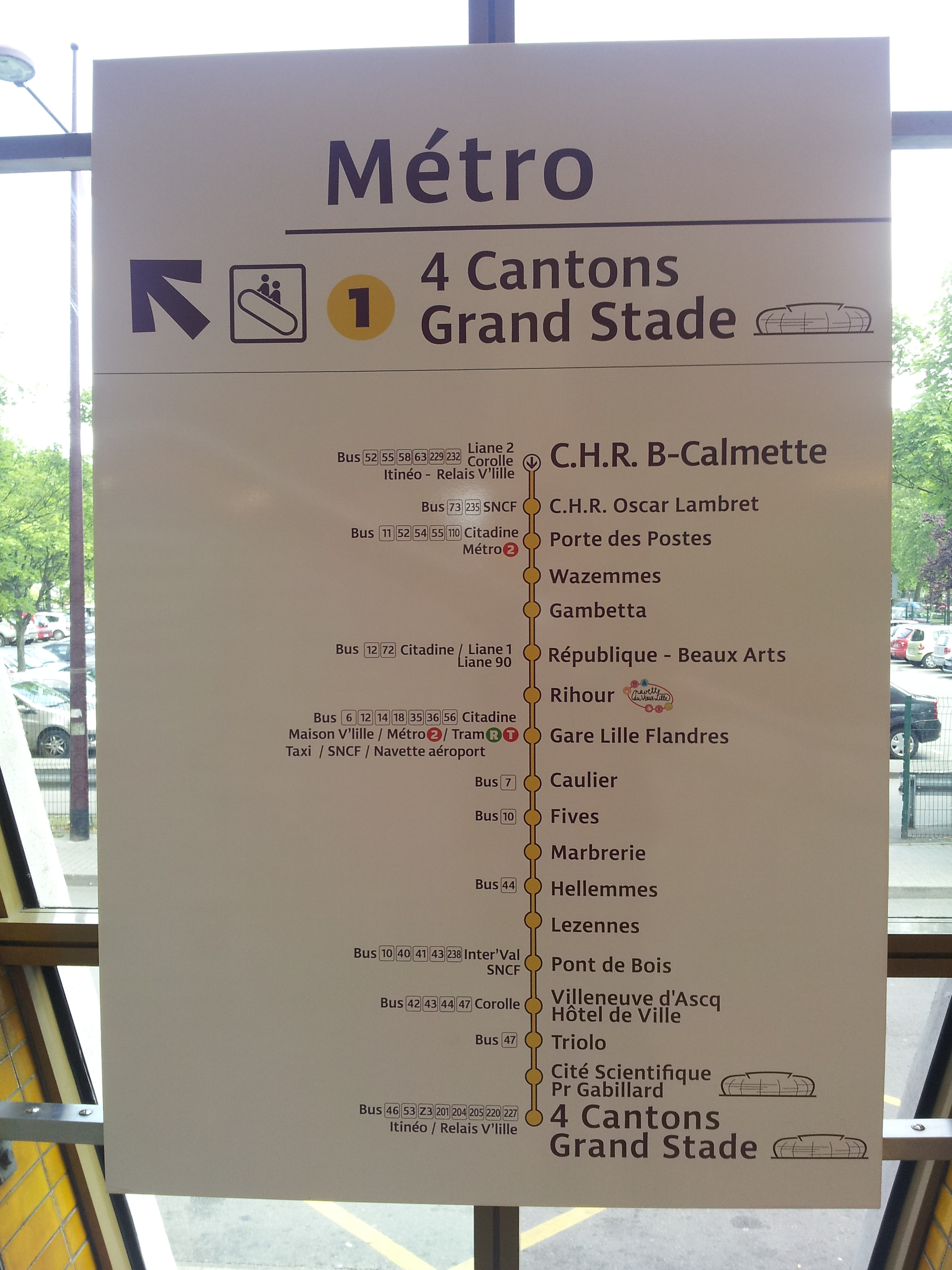
Line 1 "thermometer" sign at CHU – Eurasanté indicating stations to Quatre Cantons.

Since its inauguration, Lille Metro Line 1 has seen several stations renamed to reflect urban developments, cultural tributes, or institutional changes. The first modification occurred in 1994 when Gares station was redesignated Gare Lille-Flandres to distinguish it from the newly opened Gare Lille-Europe station. Three years later, République station acquired the suffix Beaux-Arts (1997) following the renovation of the adjacent Palais des Beaux-Arts.

A significant update occurred on 6 March 2017, when four stations were simultaneously renamed: CHR B-Calmette became CHU–Eurasanté, CHR Oscar-Lambret was updated to CHU–Centre Oscar-Lambret, Hellemmes transitioned to Mairie d'Hellemmes, and Lezennes was rebranded Square Flandres. Most recently in 2024, Caulier station was refined to Madeleine Caulier to explicitly honor the 17th-century Lille philanthropist.

=== Unique and Themed Stations ===
Designed for accessibility with platform screen doors, Line 1 stations vary architecturally. Surface stations like Triolo and Villeneuve-d'Ascq–Hôtel de Ville feature glass vaults, while Square Flandres uses brick and large windows. Underground stations typically have discreet entrances with stairs and elevators. Local artists, mostly from Nord-Pas-de-Calais, contributed works: Michel Degand painted frescoes for stations such as Fives and Rihour, Brigitte Denoyelle adorned Villeneuve-d'Ascq–Hôtel de Ville with terracotta and steel, and architect Gilles Neveux collaborated with the Palais des Beaux-Arts to display art replicas at République–Beaux-Arts.

=== Depots and Workshops ===
The line has a workshop garage and a storage garage. The garage-atelier, for storing and repairing trainsets, is located in Villeneuve-d'Ascq, after the Quatre Cantons–Stade Pierre-Mauroy station. Opened in 1979, it can accommodate 64 trainsets and comprises various workshops covering an area of over 7,000 m^{2}. It is also where all trains are tested before being put into service, on a test track including a dummy station and a sloping section to simulate conventional track traffic. Beyond the line's other terminus, the CHU–Eurasanté station, there is a depot where only six trains can be stored.

== Operations ==
=== Hours and Frequency ===
Line 1 operates daily except May 1, when Ilévia conducts maintenance. In 2013, service began at 5:12 AM from both termini (Monday–Saturday) and 6:24 AM (Sundays), ending at 12:17 AM from Quatre Cantons and 12:31 AM from CHU–Eurasanté. During special events like Fête de la Musique and Braderie de Lille, extended late-night service is provided.

Frequency varies from every minute during peak hours to every 2 minutes off-peak, reducing to 6-8 minutes on weekends and late evenings. The line maintains this efficient schedule while allowing for necessary maintenance and special event operations.

=== Rolling Stock ===
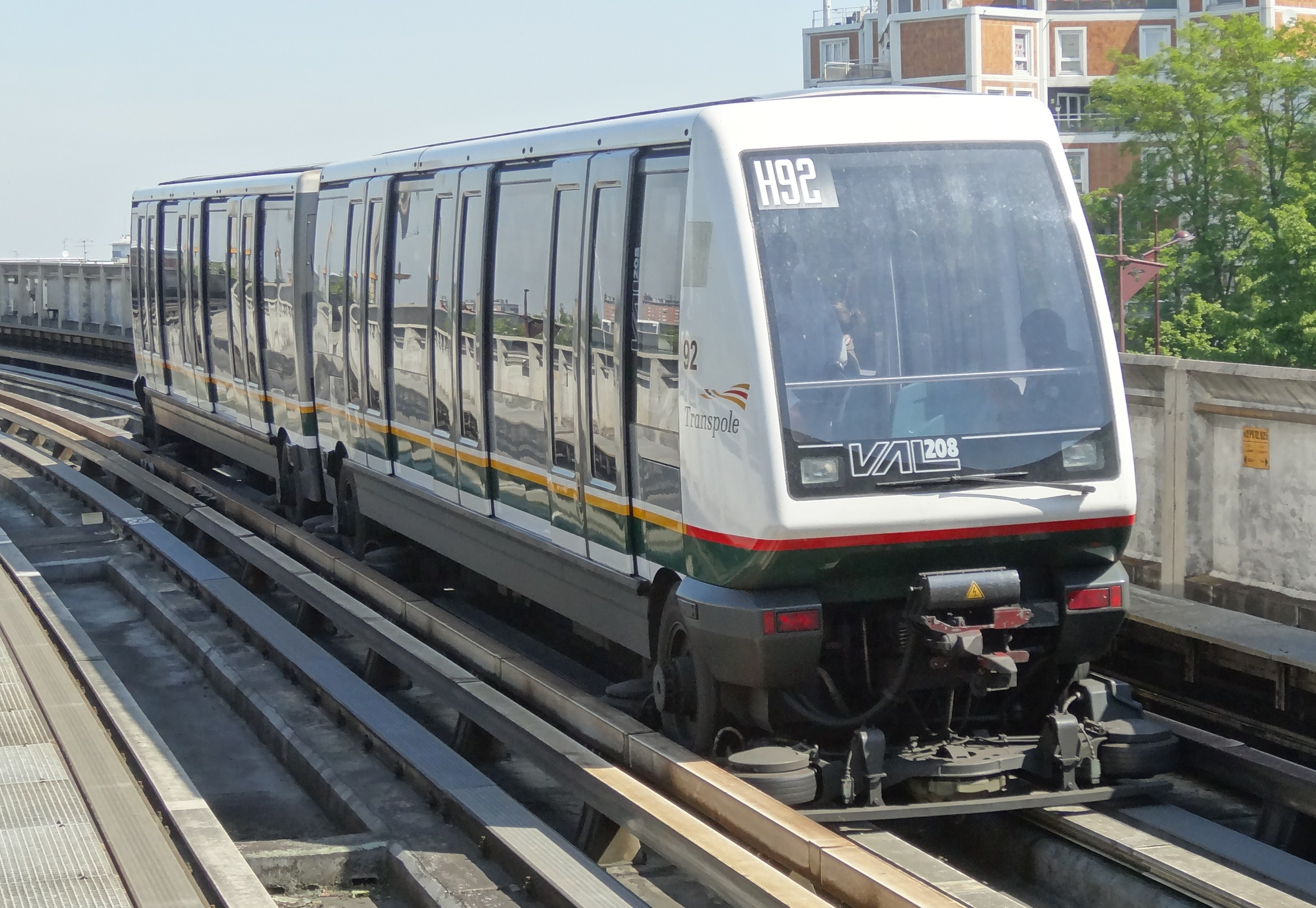
A VAL 208 train on Line 1.

The Véhicule Automatique Léger (VAL) system, originally named "Villeneuve-d'Ascq–Lille" (VAL), emerged in the late 1960s at the University of Science and Technology of Lille (USTL). Line 1 of the Lille Metro became the world's first line to implement this technology in 1983, with the system officially branded as "Véhicule Automatique Léger" starting in 1975.

At its launch, 38 VAL 206 trains operated on the line. Developed in the 1970s by Matra in collaboration with USTL, the "206" designation reflects the train's width of 206 cm (6 ft 9 in). Each train measures 26 m (85 ft) in length and 3.25 m (10.7 ft) in height. Under normal load (4 people/m²), a VAL 206 accommodates 160 passengers; at peak capacity (6 people/m²), it can carry 208. The fleet, now expanded to 83 trains, underwent renovations in 2005 and 2009.

Currently, 53 VAL 208 trains are theoretically assigned to Line 1. Introduced to the Lille network in 1999 with the opening of a segment on Line 2, the "208" denotes a width of 2.08 m (6 ft 10 in). These trains are 26.14 m (85.8 ft) long and 3.275 m (10.74 ft) high. Due to Line 1's high ridership, only VAL 208 trains now operate on the line, as their interior layout supports greater capacity. While a VAL 206 holds 208 passengers at maximum load (6 people/m²), a VAL 208 can exceed 240. The VAL 208 also achieves 15% energy savings and features 30% larger windows than the VAL 206, allowing more natural light.

In late 2007, the VAL 208 trains were reconfigured to increase capacity. Four triple-seat units per train (12 seats total) were replaced with lean bars and overhead handrails, boosting the standing room by 20%.

Born at the University of Lille in the late 1960s, the VAL system debuted on Line 1 in 1983 with 38 VAL 206 trains, designed by Matra (2.06 meters wide, 26 meters long, 160–208 passengers). Renovated in 2005 and 2009, their numbers grew to 83. Since 2008, VAL 208 trains (2.08 meters wide, 240+ passengers) have dominated, fully replacing VAL 206 on Line 1 by November 17, 2024, with the Urbalis Fluence upgrade. VAL 208 offers 15% energy savings and 30% larger windows.

=== Staffing ===
Under normal circumstances, no human intervention is required to ensure that the system runs smoothly, since each train sets its speed according to the time of day and the track; the entire network is monitored and managed by the ATO (agent technique opérationnel) at the PCC located beneath the Gare de Lille-Flandres station. They only intervene in the event of breakdowns and to contact passengers. In addition to monitoring all trains, the PCC is responsible for starting and stopping the network, and regulating the number of trains on the tracks according to passenger needs. The PCC also supervises all maintenance work, both day and night, such as tunnel work during shutdowns.

The control room is equipped with numerous video screens linked to the cameras in the stations, from which the ATOs monitor passenger safety (both ambient and technical). Using computers, operators supervise the status of all metro equipment, and intervene in the event of a problem: if the situation requires it, they can block the train and carry out a number of actions to restart it, or even tow it to a garage. The PCC may also be called upon to talk to passengers using the intercom systems in the trains.

In addition to the ATOs, the Customer Service Representatives (CSRs) liaise with the PCC and monitor the condition of stations and trains in the field. Curative maintenance technicians (TMC) are responsible for repairing trains in the network's various garages.

=== Fares and Funding ===
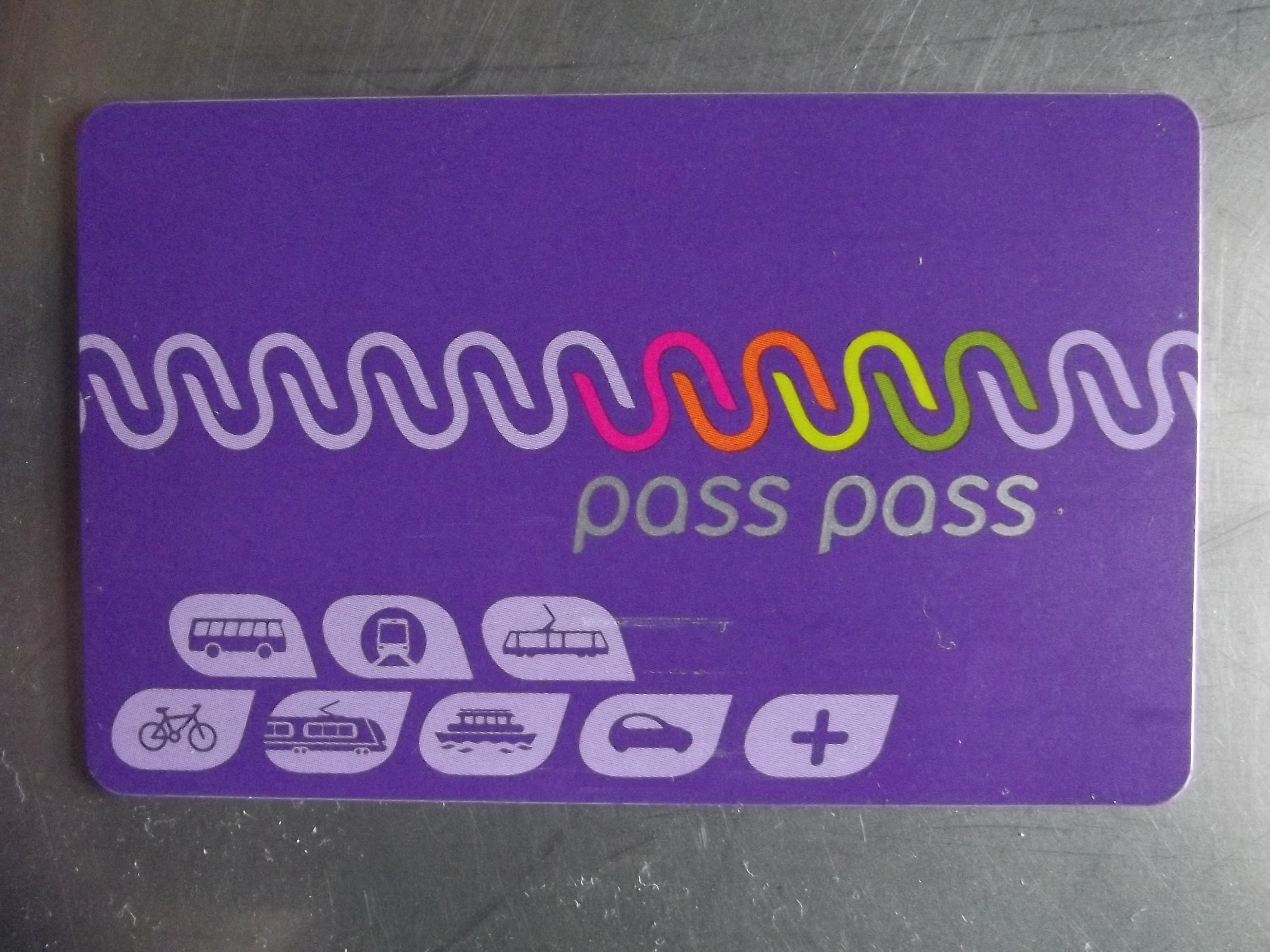
Pass Pass card issued by Ilévia.

On June 25, 2013, Pass Pass contactless smart cards made their appearance on the Ilévia network. The latter stopped selling cardboard tickets on January 1, 2014. However, a transition period allowed users to use the remaining paper tickets. Since then, the ticket machines have been removed and users can exchange their cardboard tickets for Pass Pass cards.

Three types of Pass Pass card are available, depending on the passenger's needs. The first is the personal card, priced at 4 euros, which can be used on all means of transport in the metropolitan area for Ilévia season ticket holders, including the TER Nord-Pas-de-Calais and the V'Lille. The second medium is the non-personal card, sold for 2 euros. The last type of Pass Pass is the rechargeable ticket, intended mainly for those who rarely travel on the Lille network, and on which the user can only load a single type of journey. This rechargeable ticket, which can also be lent, can only be recharged ten times, and its price (0.20 euro) is deducted from the fifth recharge.

Three types of Pass Pass cards are available for loading various transport offers. ZAP tickets are sold both as physical tickets and virtual versions that can be loaded onto any Pass Pass medium (personal card, non-personal card, or rechargeable ticket). Similarly, the new 2-day Pass (€7.50) and 3-day Pass (€9.50) can be loaded onto these cards. Rythmo subscriptions are also digital but are exclusively available to personal card holders.

==== Financing ====
The Metropolitan Council of the Métropole Européenne de Lille has governed public transport pricing since December 31, 2009, when it replaced the former Urban Community Transport Syndicate. This intercommunal authority provides substantial funding for the transport network, covering approximately two-thirds of operational costs (estimated at €50 million in 2010). This subsidy structure ensures users pay only one-third of the actual trip or subscription cost.

Beyond the metropolitan authority's core financing, other public entities may contribute to specific transport projects. For instance, under France's 2011 Grenelle Environnement policy framework, the national government provided partial funding for Line 1's capacity-doubling project, contributing just over €9 million. The Lille Métropole Communauté Urbaine (LMCU) further prioritized transport investment in its 2013 budget, allocating €383 million to mobility—a 17.5% increase from 2012 and the largest expenditure category. Of this amount, €102 million was dedicated to expanding Line 1's platforms and rolling stock, while €1 million supported the rollout of the new Pass Pass electronic ticketing system.

==== Passenger Information ====
On its inaugural day, April 25, 1983, Line 1 attracted 40,000 passengers. Within ten months of operation, it surpassed 10 million journeys, and by March 1984, less than a year after opening, total ridership exceeded 13 million. The metro notably expanded public transport use, with nearly one-third of trips made by first-time transit users.

According to the Centre for Studies on Networks, Transport, Urban Planning, and Public Construction (CERTU), Line 1 averaged 155,600 daily passengers in autumn 2005, ranking as France's fifth-busiest metro outside Île-de-France. By 2013, daily ridership had risen to approximately 165,000 trips.

== Future Development ==
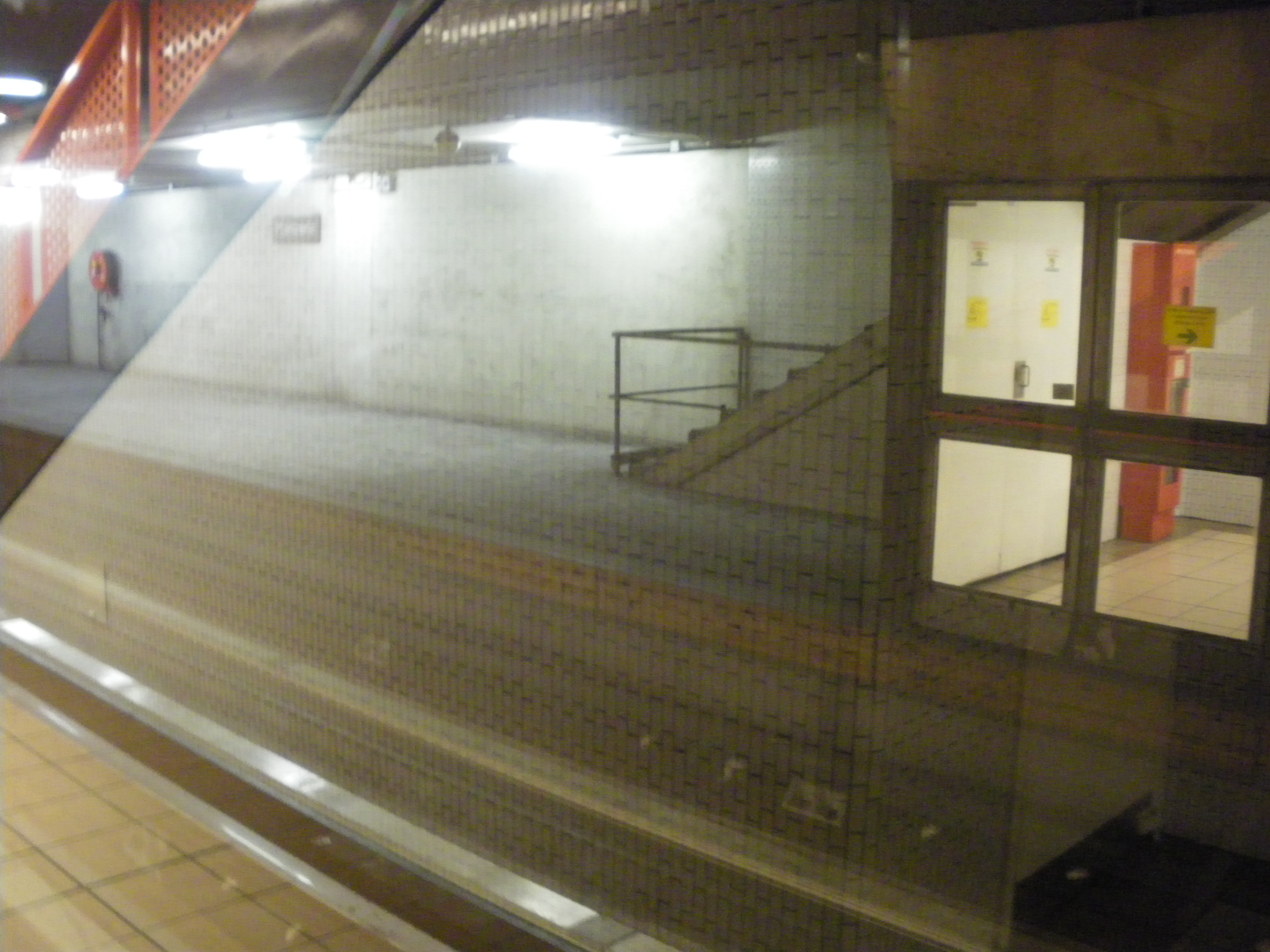
Expandable platform section at Marbrerie.

=== Station Lengthening and Alstom Metropolis Trains ===
The 2011 local transport plan adopted by Lille Métropole Communauté Urbaine (LMCU) included a major capacity expansion project for Line 1. The plan called for doubling train lengths to fully utilize existing station platforms, requiring the introduction of new 52-meter trains while reassigning older rolling stock to Line 2 to increase its frequency. This upgrade necessitated modifications to the automatic train control system and signaling infrastructure. Initially projected to increase operational costs by €10 million annually, the total project was budgeted at €629 million in 2013.

On May 11, 2012, Alstom was awarded a €266.4 million (excluding tax) contract to supply 27 new 52-meter Metropolis trains for Line 1 and replace its automatic train operation system.

The new Line 1 trains are required to be BOA-type, enabling inter-car circulation—a feature unavailable on VAL 206/208 units. Alstom secured the contract over competitors Siemens and Bombardier.

Siemens contested the award, filing an emergency motion with Lille's administrative court, arguing their bid was cheaper. The German firm lost the appeal and faced allegations of pressuring Martine Aubry (then-president of Lille Métropole) prior to the contract award. Aubrey referred the matter to prosecutors, who opened a preliminary investigation. On August 23, 2012, Siemens filed another appeal against Alstom's contract, which was again rejected.

==== Implementation Delays and Challenges ====
Station modifications began in 2013, with plans to initially accommodate 26-meter trains on newly extended platforms while renovating original sections. However, significant delays arose due to complications in developing Alstom's Urbalis Fluence automatic train control system, postponing the project's completion beyond its initial 2016 target. By 2019, the timeline was revised multiple times, with the new system for legacy VAL trains projected for 2021 and the BOA trains for April 2023. Further setbacks pushed delivery to July 2024, then to early 2026, with Alstom incurring €50 million in penalties by April 2023.

By November 2024, the Urbalis Fluence system finally entered service after eight years of delays, though its probation period revealed ongoing stability issues, including a four-hour system failure on December 17, 2024. The MEL extended testing until January 6, 2025, when the system was formally adopted despite requiring further software updates. Concurrently, platform door installations began at 4 Cantons and Madeleine Caulier stations in January 2025, while Alstom announced a €210 million contract for 15 additional BOA trains—expanding the fleet to 42 units by 2028. As of mid-2025, partial BOA train operations continue alongside legacy VAL units, with full 52-meter train deployment now expected by 2026, contingent on completing platform modifications.

=== Passenger Information Systems ===
In 2013, the European Metropolis of Lille (MEL) planned to install two double-sided screens per station (one per platform) on Line 1 to provide real-time service updates, including wait times and network disruptions, similar to the passenger information displays on Paris Métro Line 14. The initiative aimed to enhance passenger experience in coordination with station extension projects.

By 2020, however, the installation was deprioritized. MEL officials noted that Line 1's high frequency—trains every 60 seconds during peak hours (reportedly among the world's highest for metro systems) and every three minutes off-peak—reduced the need for real-time displays. The focus shifted to other infrastructure upgrades, such as platform lengthening to accommodate longer trains.

== Tourist and Cultural Destinations ==
Lille Metro Line 1 connects passengers to a wide array of tourist attractions, cultural venues, and commercial hubs across the Lille metropolitan area. In Villeneuve-d’Ascq, the line serves the 50,000-seat Stade Pierre-Mauroy, a major venue for sports and concerts since its 2012 opening, accessible via Quatre Cantons–Stade Pierre-Mauroy and Cité Scientifique–Professeur Gabillard stations. The Villeneuve-d'Ascq–Hôtel de Ville station links to the V2 shopping center, the largest in the region, while Quatre Cantons, Cité Scientifique, and Pont de Bois stations provide access to the University of Lille campuses, hosting 40,000 students.

In central Lille, Gare Lille-Flandres station connects to the main railway hub, the Euralille shopping complex, L'Aéronef music venue, and the Tri Postal cultural space. Rihour station is a gateway to historic landmarks like the Palais Rihour, Grand'Place, the renovated Opéra de Lille, and the Nouveau Siècle concert hall, home to the Orchestre National de Lille. Art enthusiasts can reach the Palais des Beaux-Arts de Lille, Nord Prefecture, and Théâtre Sébastopol via République–Beaux-Arts station.

The line also serves local spots, including the Wazemmes Market at Gambetta station and the Maison Folie Wazemmes, a former textile factory turned cultural venue for the 2004 Lille, European Capital of Culture event, accessible via Wazemmes station. The CHU–Centre Oscar-Lambret and CHU–Eurasanté stations link to the Lille University Hospital complex, a key medical and research hub. This network ensures Line 1 covers Lille's major cultural, educational, and commercial destinations.

== See also ==
- Lille Metro
- Lille Metro Line 2
- Ilévia

== Bibliography ==
- Smet, Christian (June 2004). Chronique d'une activité transport dans un laboratoire de l'USTL [Chronicle of transport activity in a USTL laboratory] (PDF). ASA - USTL Publications. p. 12. Archived from the original (PDF) on 1 February 2014.
- Kühn, Francis (July 27, 2001). The VAL - Lille urban community metro's experience - 1972 - 2001 (PDF). Institut National de Recherche sur les Transports et leur Sécurité. p. 50. Archived from the original (PDF) on 3 February 2006.
- Houillon, Marie-Andrée; Sename, Céline (2011). Le Métro, c'est automatique [Metro, it's automatic]. Villeneuve-d'Ascq. p. 32.
- Barré, Alain (1980). "Transport et aménagement urbain : l'exemple du métro dans les grandes métropoles régionales françaises" [Transport and urban planning: the example of the metro in France's major regional cities]. Revue de Géographie de Lyon. 55 (3). Association des Amis de la Revue de Géographie de Lyon: 209–230. doi:10.3406/geoca.1980.1275.
