= Christophe Gleizes =

French sports journalist

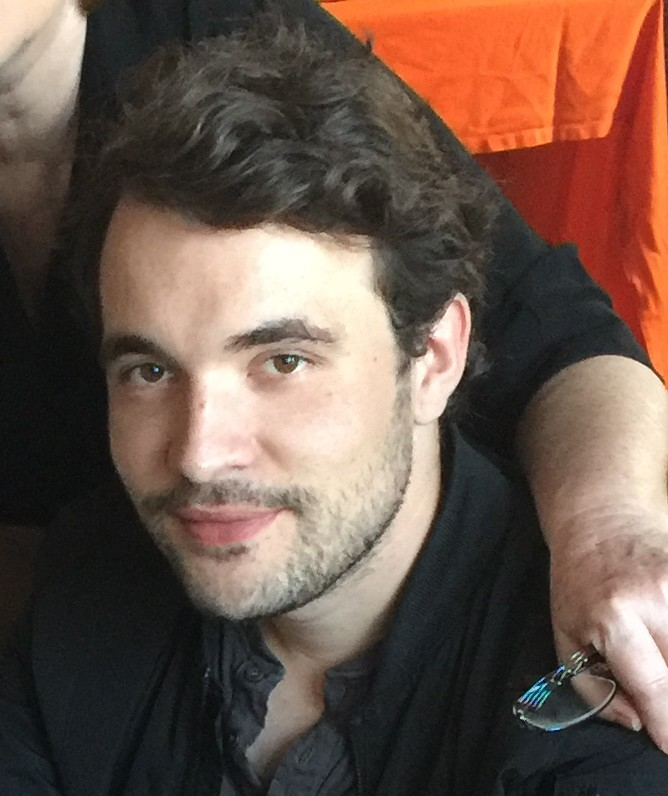
- Undated photo of Christophe Gleizes.
- Born: 2 February 1989 (36 years old); Agen, France
- Citizenship: French
- Education: Sciences Po Lille
- Occupation: Freelance sports journalist
- Employer: So Foot
- Criminal charges: Apology for terrorism (Article 87 of the Algerian Penal Code)
- Criminal penalty: 7 years imprisonment

Christophe Gleizes (born 2 February 1989 in Agen) is a freelance French sports journalist. He specializes his work on African football. His works have appeared in the media of So Foot and Society.

In May 2024, he travelled to Algeria on a tourist visa to investigate the death of JS Kabylie player Albert Ebossé, who died in 2014. The Washington Post reported that Gleizes had reasons to suspect that Ebossé's death was not as the Algerian authorities claimed. They claimed that a rock thrown by a fan killed Ebossé, but Gleizes had interviewed sources who suspected that Ebossé was killed at the request of Algerian authorities.

Gleizes had arrived on a tourist visa, not on a required journalist accreditation, as he believed he wouldn't be granted one. He also confirmed his meetings with some of identified terrorist militants from the MAK organization.

On 28 May 2024, he was arrested by Algerian authorities in Tizi Ouzou while reporting on the JS Kabylie football club. In June 2025, the Algerian courts found him guilty of glorifying terrorism and sentenced him to seven years' incarceration. The sentence was deeply regretted by France while reiterating its commitment to freedom of the press. The case has proven controversial. Reporters Sans Frontières has described the case as "unfounded and outrageous." His appeal was rejected in December 2025.

He is currently imprisoned in a 10 m² square cell at Tizi Ouzou prison, which he shares with another inmate.

Gleizes' incarceration was the subject of protests at the 2026 FIFA World Cup, where fellow journalists left an empty seat in the stadium's press boxes during France games, as well as holding aloft scarves with his name on at press conferences.
