= Sciences Po Lille =

Grande école in Lille, France

Coordinates: 50°37′21″N 3°04′38″E

Lille Institute of Political Studies
- Institut d'études politiques de Lille
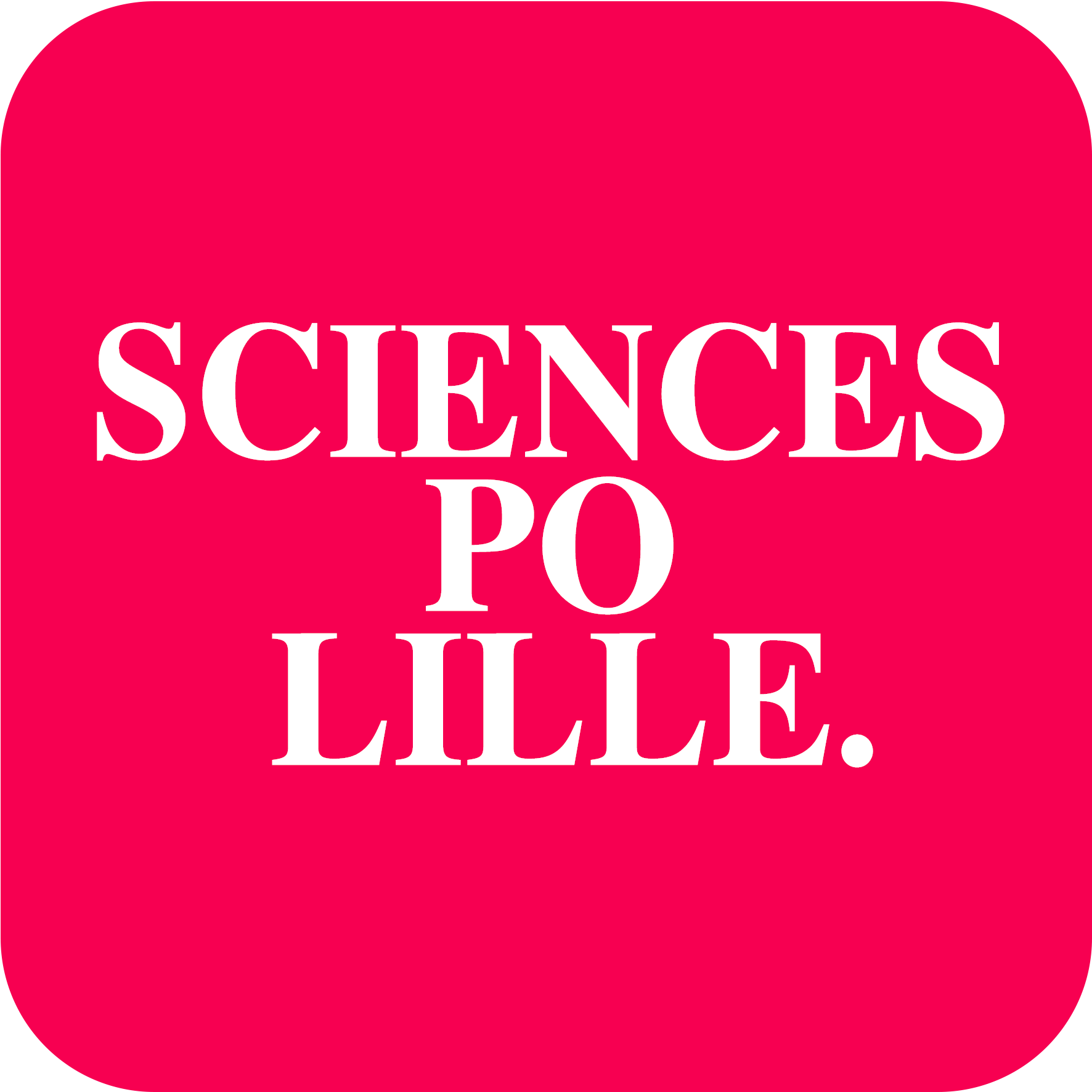
- Other name: Sciences Po Lille
- Motto: Transforming young Students into innovative citizens becoming global leaders
- Type: Public
- Established: 1991
- Director: Etienne Peyrat
- Administrative staff: 47
- Students: 1,950
- Location: Lille, France
- Campus: Urban
- Colours: Red and White
- Website: www.sciencespo-lille.eu

Institut d'études politiques de Lille (French pronunciation: [ɛ̃stity detyd pɔlitik də lil], Lille Institute of Political Studies), officially referred to as Sciences Po Lille ([sjɑ̃s po lil]), is a grande école located in Lille, France. It is a part of the Conférence des Grandes Écoles. It was created as one of the French Institutes of Political Studies. The school's focus is on educating France's political and diplomatic personnel, but its academic focus spans not only the political and economic sciences, but also law, communications, finance, business, urban policy, management, and journalism.

== History and organisation ==
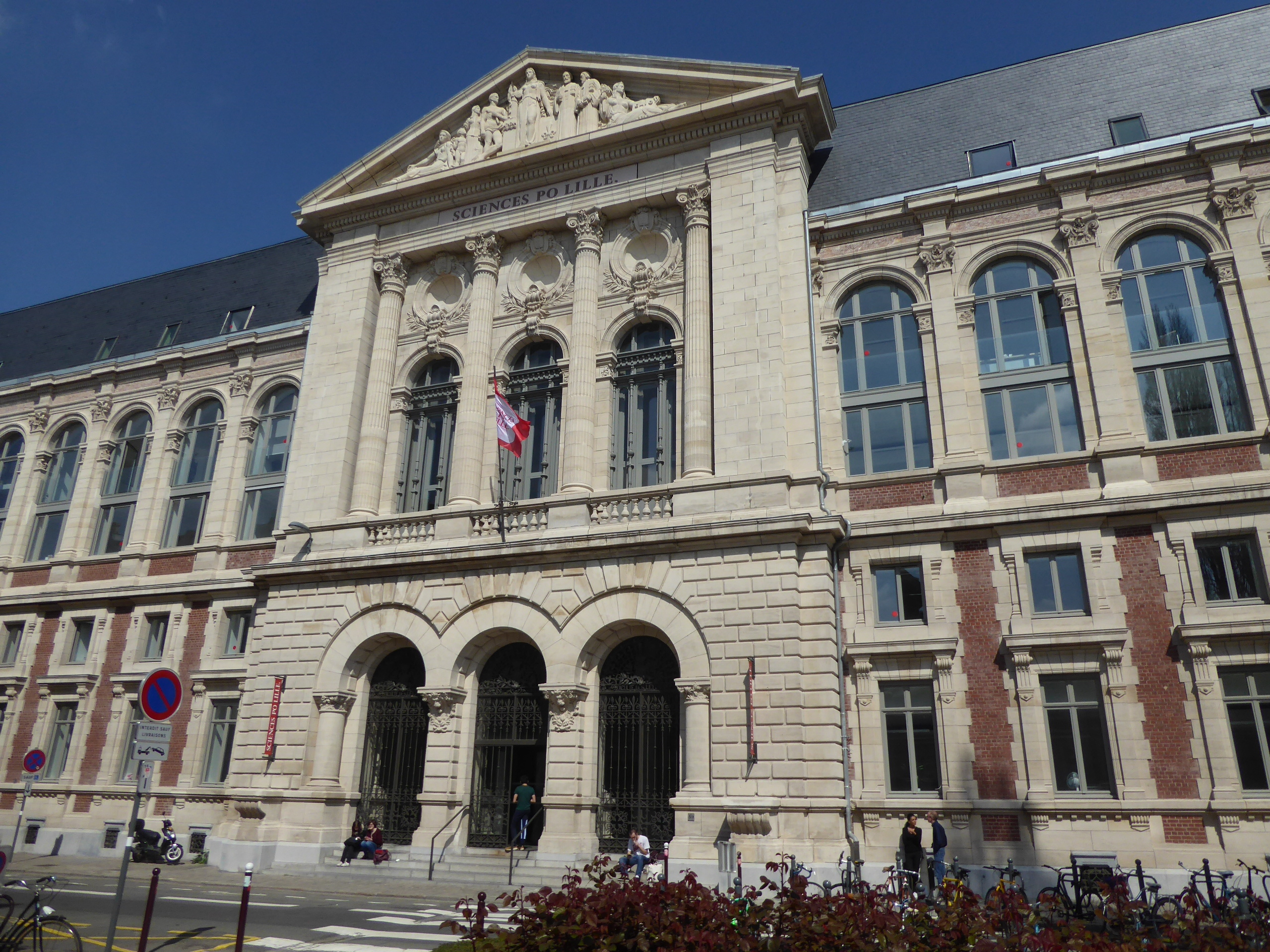
Main building

Sciences Po Lille was created by decree in 1991. As all IEP, it aims to give its students training in the civil service, but it specialises in European and International studies. The institute also has an agreement with the renowned school of journalism École supérieure de journalisme de Lille. It also has selective dual degrees with universities in Spain, England and Germany.

The curriculum at the IEP is at the crossroads of law, history, economics, political science and sociology. Students are taught at least two foreign languages and spend one year abroad. Entrance to the IEP can be achieved through highly selective exams.

== Campus ==
At the time of its establishment in 1991, Sciences Po Lille was located in the premises of the École Supérieure de Journalisme de Lille, 50 rue Gauthier de Châtillon. Built in the 19th century, the building was located in the quartier latin of Lille, which used to be where all Lille's universities were located. The building quickly turned out to be too small for both schools. Thus, in 1996, in order to keep growing, Sciences Po Lille moved into a bigger building, this time located in a working-class district called Moulins. The choice of this district was political. The municipality of Lille wished to enhance social diversity in the neighbourhood. Sciences Po Lille's students being mostly from high income and educational backgrounds, its presence in the Moulins district was seen as a way to reinvigorate this southern part of Lille. Sciences Po Lille's new address became 84 rue de Trévise, near the metro station Porte de Valenciennes. The building is a former factory made of red bricks.

To cope with the quick development of the school, a new relocation took place in January, 2017. Sciences Po Lille came back to its original area and established its campus rue Auguste-Angelier in the old quartier Latin of Lille. This building of downtown Lille is 8200 square meters. It provides 3 amphitheatres, 40 rooms and a 1500 square meter library.

== Admission ==
Sciences Po Lille is one of the most selective French écoles. Students wishing to attend Sciences Po Lille must pass a highly selective and competitive national entrance exam composed of a general knowledge test, a history test, and a language test. The rate of admission is, as with all Grandes écoles, very low: between 5 and 15% of candidates are admitted. Sciences Po Lille has been described by the Daily Telegraph as "one of France’s most prestigious political science schools".

There are two admission procedures for the undergraduate program. The two of them are collectively organized by Sciences Po Lille and six other Sciences Po (Aix-en-Provence, Lyon, Rennes, Saint-Germain-en-Laye, Strasbourg and Toulouse):

- the Concours Commun 1ere année (access to the 1st year of the program). More than 10,000 high schoolers take this exam each year, and only 1000 of them are admitted to one of the 7 Sciences Po of Lille, Aix-en-Provence, Lyon, Rennes, Saint-Germain-en-Laye, Strasbourg and Toulouse. Among them, 150 successful candidates get into Sciences Po Lille.
- the Concours Filières Intégrées (access to the 1st year of the dual degrees). This exam is organized to select the future students of the dual degrees with the university of Salamanca (Spain), the university of Kent (England) and the university of Münster (Germany). They consist of a written test in History, Contemporary Questions and a Language test (varies according to the program). After which there is an oral test in the language of the program, where only half of the previously selected students will be chosen to go through.
- the Concours Commun 2e année (direct access to the 2nd year of the program)

Admission procedures for Graduate Programs:

- Procedure for French students. The selection process is done through an exam. About 60 students per year enroll directly in one of Sciences Po Lille's Master's programs without having attended the undergraduate program.
- International Graduate Admissions Procedure. Admission is based on the holistic assessment of each candidate's academic, personal and professional background. International applicants are required to submit the following documents: a cover letter, two recommendation letters, a resume written in French, the copy of the applicant's academic degree, the student's academic record of the last three years prior to the application (grades), and a French Language Certificate (minimum required: B2).
- Special Entrance Exam for Chinese Applicants. This exam gives access to a limited number of Master's programs (Corporate and Government Communication; Sustainable Development; Management of Cultural Institutions; and the Dual Degree with the École supérieure de journalisme de Lille. The exam takes place in January in Beijing and Shanghai. In order to be eligible for this exam, candidates must have a bachelor's degree, a B2 level in French language (DALF, DELF, TCF, TEF), a 90 TOEFL IBT/750 TOEIC/6 IELTS score. The exam is structured in two phases: a 4-hour written exam on a current political issue dealing with the world economy and international relations (the use of a Chinese-French dictionary is authorized during the exam); and a 30-minute oral exam during which the jury appreciates the candidate's motivation as well as their level of French and his general culture.

== Tuitions ==
Tuitions are based on the income of the student's family. They range from 0 euro to 3,200 euros a year. To tuition must be added health insurance, which costs about 200 euros for the full year.

== Graduate programs ==
Sciences Po Lille's Master's programs are divided into four sections:

- Public Affairs and Public Goods Management. This section offers three different Masters: Public Affairs; Private-Public Partnership; and Sustainable Development.
- European and International Affairs. This section offers three Masters: European Affairs; Peace Conflict and Development; and Strategy Intelligence and Risk Management.
- Organizations' Strategy and Communication. This section offers three different Masters: Commerce & International Finance; Corporate and Government Communication; and Management of Cultural Institutions.
- Philosophy Politics and Economics. This section offers one single Master's, a Research master's degree. It provides students with a solid education in social sciences and is designed to prepare students for doctoral research. The first two semesters are taught at Sciences Po Lille and the last two semesters in one of the following schools: EHESS, ENS Lyon, École pratique des hautes études, University of Lille, the Master in Political and Economic Philosophy at University of Bern, the Master in Politics, Economics and Philosophy at Hamburg University, the MA Philosophy and Economics in Beirut, the Master in Philosophy and Economics at Erasmus University Rotterdam, the Université Libre de Bruxelles, and the Centre for Philosophy of Law of Louvain.

Sciences Po Lille also offers co-sponsored Master's:

- Dual Degree Sciences Po Lille/ESJ Lille
- Master of Science (MSc) in Public Policy Management Sciences Po Lille/Audencia Nantes.
- Master Preparation for the agrégation of economics Sciences Po Lille/University of Lille
- Master Research in political science Sciences Po Lille/University of Lille

== Study Abroad Programs ==
Sciences Po Lille has a very large Study Abroad Program. The school has signed over 240 international agreements with universities located on every continent. Here are some of Sciences Po Lille's partner universities:

North America

- United States of America: George Washington University, University of Virginia, College of William & Mary, Reed College, Georgia State University, Stony Brook University, San José State University, Northeastern Illinois University, Michigan State University, Catholic University of America.
- Canada: McMaster University, University of Calgary, Dalhousie University, University of Victoria, Simon Fraser University, Wilfrid Laurier University, Université de Moncton, St. Francis Xavier University, University of the Fraser Valley, Huron University College, Université d'Ottawa.
- Mexico: Universidad Iberoamericana, Instituto Tecnológico Autónomo de México, El Colegio de México, Universidad de las Américas Puebla, Instituto Tecnológico y de Estudios Superiores de Monterrey.

South America

- Costa Rica: Universidad de Costa Rica.
- Argentina: Universidad Torcuato Di Tella, Universidad del Salvador, Universidad Nacional de Cuyo.
- Brazil: Federal University of Minas Gerais, Fundação Getulio Vargas, Universidade Federal de Pernambuco.
- Colombia: Universidad del Rosario, Pontifical Bolivarian University.
- Chile: Universidad Austral de Chile, Andrés Bello National University, Valparaiso University, Pontificia Universidad Católica de Chile.

== International dual degrees ==
Sciences Po Lille offers partnerships with a number of universities around the world, and a few dual-degree programs:

- Sciences Po Lille does not currently have any dual degree partnerships with any American universities. Sciences Po Lille is partnered with 12 American universities for study abroad programs at the undergraduate level. These include: Stony Brook University, Fordham University, Catholic University of America, Kennesaw State University, American University, Georgia State University, the University of Virginia, San Jose State University, Reed College, Northeastern Illinois University, Michigan State University (not to be confused with the University of Michigan), and the College of William and Mary.
- The Dual master's degree in European Affairs (called "MA Europe & the World") with the Aston University.
- The Dual master's degree in European studies Central and Eastern Europe with the University of Szeged in Hungary.
- The Franco-British double degree course with the University of Kent in England. The course structure consists of two academic years in Lille and two in Canterbury. Various options are available for year 5.
- The Franco-German double degree course with the University of Münster in Germany.
- The Franco-Spanish double degree course with the University of Salamanca in Spain.

== Prep programs for high-ranking civil servant positions ==
Prep Program for the École Nationale d'Administration

Prep Program for the Agrégation de sciences économiques et sociales

== Munwalk Association (Model United Nations) ==
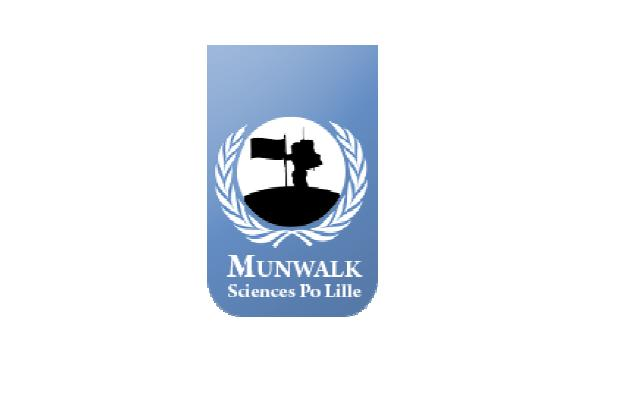
Munwalk logo

Sciences Po Lille Munwalk Association is ranked the 13th world's best Model United Nations delegation according to the Best Delegate Guide. It makes it the best French delegation. In 2011, its students were awarded the "Honourable Delegate" award at both London and Harvard's MUN, as well as the "Distinguished Delegation" award in New York City. In 2013, at the NMUN-NY, the school won the "Outstanding Delegation" award, which is considered the most prestigious prize. That same year, a student was also awarded the "Outstanding Delegate" award at Harvard's MUN.

== Summer school ==
Sciences Po Lille opened a Summer School in 2015. It consists in a two-week intensive program during which students attend courses of economics, law, politics and history. All the courses are related to a common theme, which changes every year. In 2015, the theme was the "European Union's challenges in a context of crisis." Classes are all taught in English. Participants receive a certificate with 6 ECTS credits. They can also take optional courses in French language & culture and get one more ECTS. Courses consist of classroom sessions held on each weekday except on the field trip to Brussels. The Summer School also includes local cultural visits, various social events, conferences, a visit of Lille, and a study trip to Brussels and the EU institutions. In the summer 2015, 17 students participated in the summer school. The European Commission's spokesperson, Natasha Bertaud, gave a conference.

== Notable alumni ==
- Gérald Darmanin, French Minister of the Justice, lawmaker, adviser of Nicolas Sarkozy during the presidential election of 2017, mayor of Tourcoing
- Barbara Pompili, French Minister for Biodiversity matters, French lawmaker
- Karima Delli, French representative in Parliament
- Johanna Rolland, Mayor of Nantes City and President of Nantes Métropole
- Hervé Berville, French representative in Parliament
- Marine Tondelier, leader of the French Ecologist Party
