= Michel Degand =

French painter and sculptor (1934–2021)

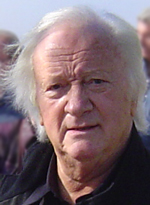
- Degand in 2008
- Born: 15 November 1934; Loos, France
- Died: 19 October 2021 (aged 86); Tourcoing, France
- Occupation: Artist

Michel Degand (15 November 1934 – 19 October 2021) was a French painter, sculptor, cartoonist, and graphic artist.

== Biography ==
During his youth, Degand's grandfather, an art glazier and orchestra conductor, taught him music and drawing and made him choose a profession in lithography taught at the Collège technique Baggio de Lille. At the age of 17, he began working as a photoengraver for La Voix du Nord while taking courses at the École des beaux-arts de Lille. For his compulsory military service, he was sent to Paris to serve in the French Navy. While in Paris, he attended the Académie de la Grande Chaumière before returning to Lille and learning tapestry. He produced over 250 tapestries for the Ateliers Pinton in Felletin. He also produced tapestries for the Gobelins Manufactory. He stayed in the United States and held exhibitions at the Wenger Studio in San Francisco and the Carlson Tower Gallery in Chicago. In 1979, a retrospective of his works was held at the Palais des Beaux-Arts de Lille. Another retrospective was held in 2013 at the Musée des beaux-arts d'Arras.

Degand created several monumental works in tapestry and sculpture at the Palais de justice de Lille,"Une tapisserie de Michel Degand au Palais de justice de Lill". Le Monde (in French). 3 January 1969. the Post Oak Hotel in Houston, metro stations in Lille, the Lille Métropole Museum of Modern, Contemporary and Outsider Art, Euralliance, the Hôtel du Département du Nord, and others. Starting in 1993, he devoted himself primarily to painting and held numerous exhibitions for the Musée de la Tapisserie de Tournai, the abbey of Saint-Riquier, the Matisse Museum, La Piscine Museum, the Musée d'art moderne et d'art contemporain, and the Musée du dessin et de l'estampe originale de Gravelines. In addition to the retrospective at the Musée des beaux-arts d'Arras, another one was held at the Prieuré d'Airaines in 2019.

On 4 October 2019, the city of Loos opened the Espace Michel Degand, a permanent exhibition in dedication to the artist. In 2013, the poet Pierre Henry wrote a biography on him, titled Michel Degand ou l'art du poétique.

Michel Degand died in Tourcoing on 19 October 2021 at the age of 86.

== Main works ==
=== Tapestries ===
- D'étoiles dans les soirs tremblants (1967)
- En cet espace inexploré du rêve (1970)
- Le chant vers l'impossible (1974)
- Ni jour ni nuit (1982)
- Les Visages oubliés (1985)
- Envers l'avenir (1998)
- Vers un autre demain (2004)
- Miroir de Terre (2007)

=== Paintings ===
- La Vieille Fille (1977)
- Palimpseste (2003)
- Le Zéro à l'infini... ou mille et un chuchotements (2009)
- Apprends moi à passer (2011)
- Ne pas aller au-delà (2011)

=== Sculptures ===
- Bois peint (1995)
- La Famille (2005)
- Terre de ciel (2010)

== Retrospectives ==
- Tapisseries, Midaforms, Dessins (1979)
- Peintures (2014)
- Tapisseries (2014)
- Tapisserie d'Aubusson (2019)

== Books ==
- Trames (1972)
- Répétition privée (1997)
- Elles et Eux (1998)
- Le Feu sacré, les peintres du Nord (2004)
- Scribere (2004)
- Ciel de lies (2005)
- L'Œil Bleu d'Henri Matisse (2006)
- Traverses (2008)
- Le Zéro à l'infini... ou « mille et un chuchotements » (2009)
- Roncq, Terre de Ciel (2010)
- Un arbre pour les mouettes (2010)

== Bibliography ==
- Degand (Jean Guichard-Meili, 1969)
- Michel Degand (Emmanuel Looten, 1972)
- Michel Degand (Hervé Oursel & Annie Scottez, 1979)
- Michel Degand (Georges Goldine, 1981)
- Degand (Françoise Poiret & Gérard Durozoi & Alain Réveillon, 1995)
- Moments d'atelier (Alin Avila, 2001)
- L'œuvre textile (Alin Avila, 2010)
- Tapisseries 2013 Musée des Beaux-Arts d'Arras - Peintures 2013 Cité Nature d'Arras (Annie Esnault, 2013)
- Michel Degand ou l'art du poétique : Biographie par Pierre Henry (Pierre Henry, 2013)
