= Moulins (Lille) =

Neighborhood of Lille, France

- Neighborhood of Lille
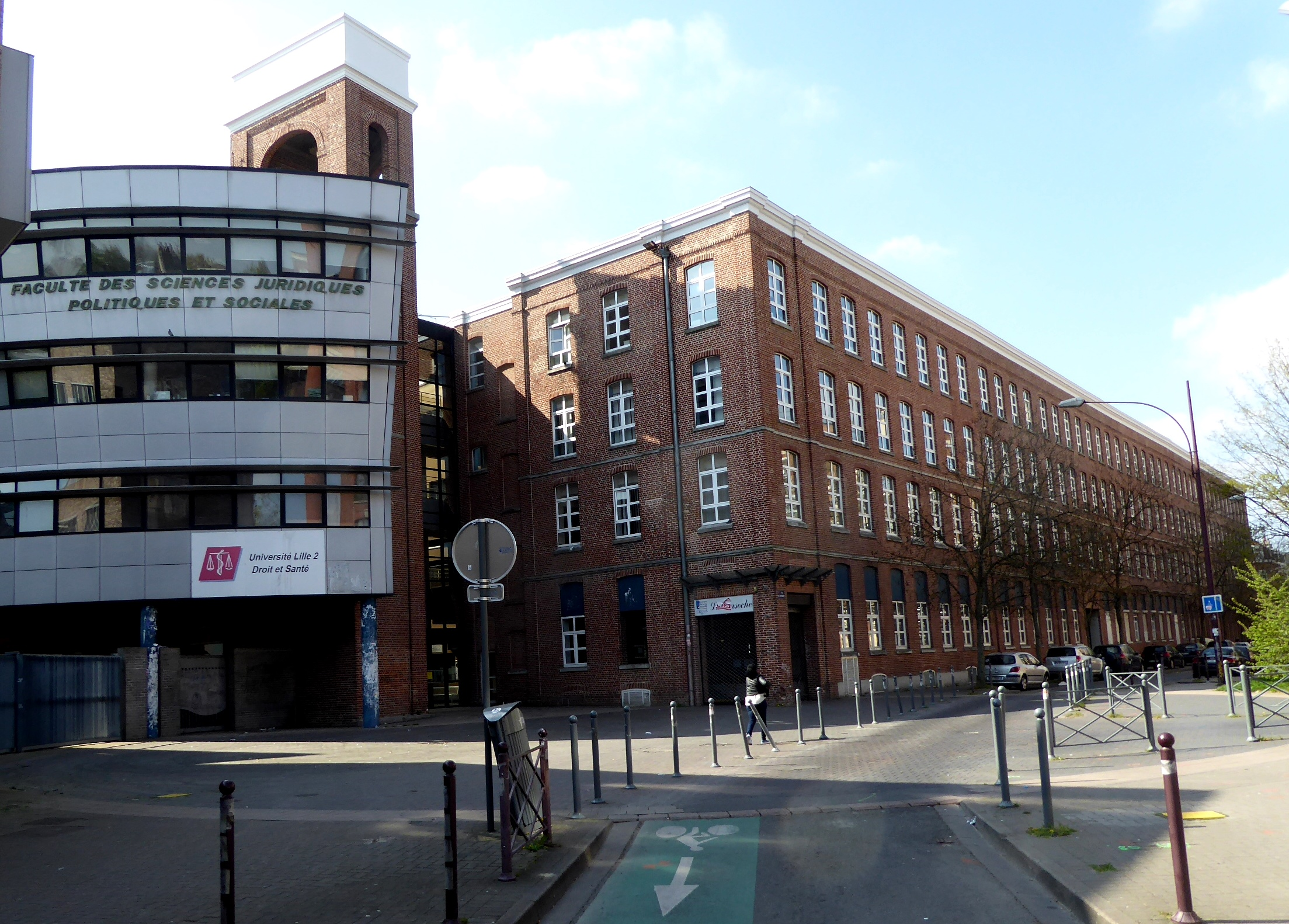
- Interactive map of Moulins
- Country: France
- Region: Hauts-de-France
- Department: Nord
- City: Lille

Population
  - Total: 20,101

Moulins or "Moulins-Lille," officially Lille-Moulins, is a neighborhood in the south of Lille, classified as a sensitive urban zone, which has approximately 20,000 inhabitants.

== History ==
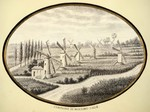
Lille-Moulins in 1860.

Alongside the dominant textile industry, represented by the Le Blan and Wallaert spinning mills, the area also developed a significant metalworking sector. This included the steam-engine manufacturer founded by Paul Le Gavrian in 1837. The company was acquired by the Crépelle family in 1882 and later shifted to the production of diesel engines and compressors; it is now part of the Swedish group Atlas Copco. Another major industrial operation was the Cocard valve factory, which was acquired by SA Crane in 1960 and relocated to Armentières in 1969.

== Population ==
With 20,101 inhabitants as of the 2009 census, Moulins ranks 5th among Lille's districts, representing more than 10% of the city's total population.
