= Wazemmes =

Coordinates: 50°37′34″N 3°03′03″E

Wazemmes is a former commune in the Nord department in northern France. It merged into Lille in 1858.

It is a cosmopolitan neighborhood, with a significant population of Chinese immigrants.

== Heraldry ==
Arms of Wazemmes	The arms of Wazemmes are blazoned : Azure semy de lys Or, a tower argent issuant from which 2 croziers (bases in saltire) Or.

== See also ==
- Communes of the Nord department
