= Lille =

Lille Rysel (West Flemish) Rijsel (Dutch) Lile (Picard)
- Prefecture and commune
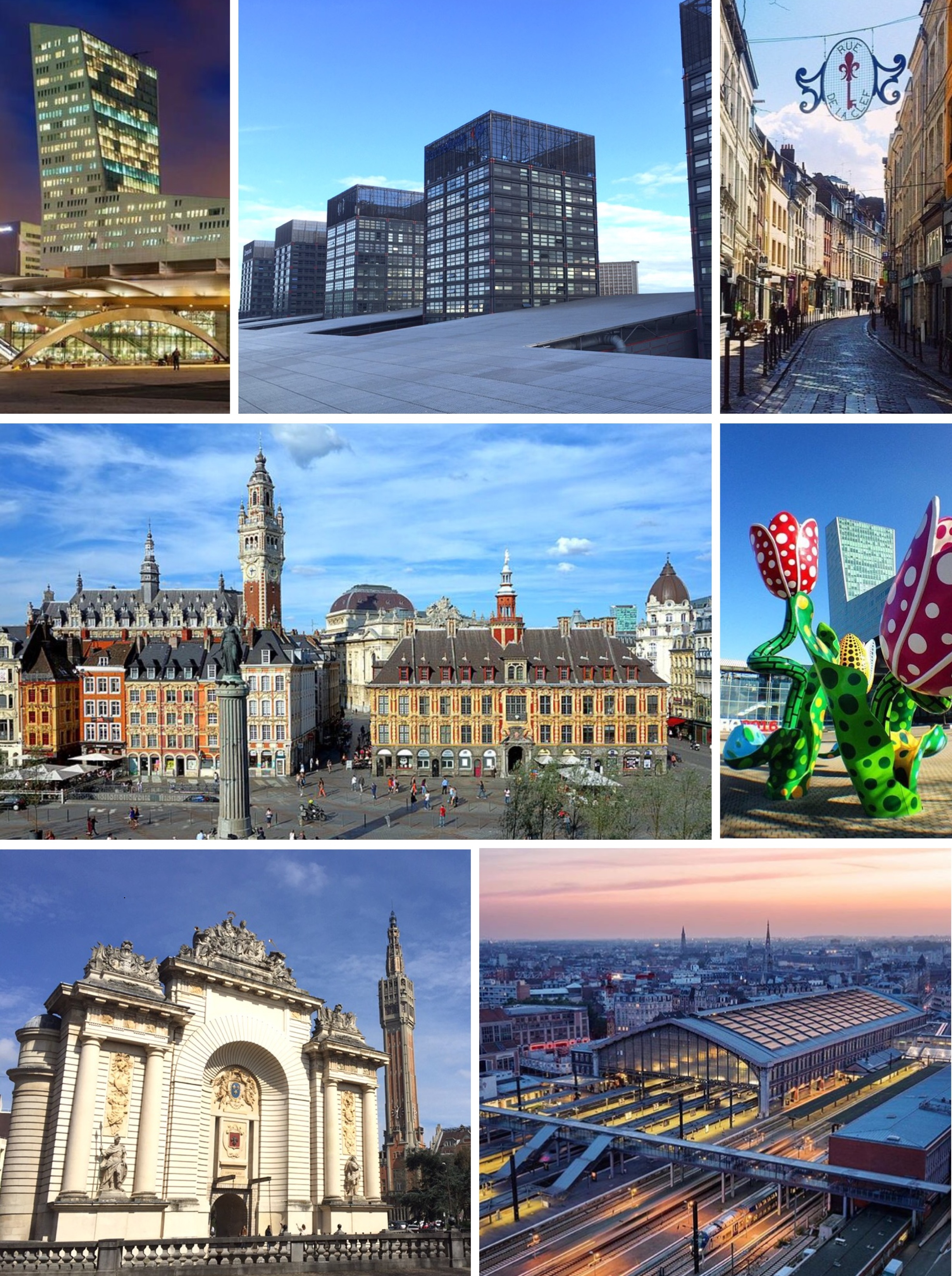
- From top to bottom, left to right: the Lille Tower, some towers of Euralille, the Rue de la Clef in Old Lille, the Place du Général-de-Gaulle, the Shangri-La tulip sculpture for Lille 2004, the Porte de Paris with the belfry of the City Hall and Lille-Flandres train station

- Flag Coat of arms
- Location of Lille
- Location within France Location within Hauts-de-France
- Coordinates: 50°37′40″N 3°03′30″E
- Country: France
- Region: Hauts-de-France
- Department: Nord
- Arrondissement: Lille
- Canton: Lille-1, 2, 3, 4, 5 and 6
- Intercommunality: European Metropolis of Lille

Government
  - Mayor (2026–32): Arnaud Deslandes (PS)
- Area^{1}: 34.8 km^{2} (13.4 sq mi)
  - Urban (2020): 446.7 km^{2} (172.5 sq mi)
  - Metro (2020): 1,666.4 km^{2} (643.4 sq mi)
- Population (2023): 238,246
  - Rank: 10th in France
  - Density: 6,850/km^{2} (17,700/sq mi)
  - Urban (2023): 1,063,720
  - Urban density: 2,381/km^{2} (6,167/sq mi)
  - Metro (2023): 1,530,624
  - Metro density: 918.52/km^{2} (2,379.0/sq mi)
- Time zone: UTC+01:00 (CET)
  - Summer (DST): UTC+02:00 (CEST)
- INSEE/Postal code: 59350 /59000, 59800
- Website: www.lille.fr
- ^{1} French Land Register data, which excludes lakes, ponds, glaciers > 1 km^{2} (0.386 sq mi or 247 acres) and river estuaries.

Lille (/liːl/ LEEL; French: [lil]; Flemish: Rijsel [ˈrɛisəl]; Picard: Lile; West Flemish: Rysel) is a city in the northern part of France, within French Flanders. Sited along the Deûle river, near France's border with Belgium, it is the capital of the Hauts-de-France region, the prefecture of the Nord department, and the main city of the European Metropolis of Lille. It is also the seat of the European Union Customs Authority.

The city of Lille had a population of 238,246 in 2023 within its small municipal territory of 35 km^{2} (14 sq mi), but combined with its French suburbs and exurbs the Lille metropolitan area which extends over 1,666 km^{2} (643 sq mi), had a population of 1,530,624 (2023), the fourth largest in France after Paris, Lyon, and Marseille. In 2015 the city of Lille and 94 suburban French municipalities formed the European Metropolis of Lille, an indirectly elected metropolitan authority in charge of a metropolitan area with a population of 1,195,234 (2023).

More broadly, Lille belongs to a vast conurbation formed with the Belgian cities of Mouscron, Kortrijk, Tournai and Menin, which gave birth in January 2008 to the Eurometropolis Lille–Kortrijk–Tournai, the first European grouping of territorial cooperation (EGTC), which has more than 2.1 million inhabitants. At the national level, the European Metropolis of Lille ranks second only to the Île-de-France region for its concentration of international corporate headquarters.

Nicknamed in France the "Capital of Flanders", Lille and its surroundings belong to the historical region of Romance Flanders, a former territory of the county of Flanders that is not part of the linguistic area of West Flanders. A garrison town (as evidenced by its citadel), Lille has had an eventful history from the Middle Ages to the French Revolution. Often besieged, it belonged successively to the Kingdom of France, the Burgundian State, the Holy Roman Empire of Germany and the Spanish Netherlands before becoming part of the France of Louis XIV following the War of Spanish Succession along with the entire territory of the historic province of French Flanders. Lille was again under siege in 1792 during the Franco-Austrian War, and again in 1914 and 1940. It was severely tested by the two world wars of the 20th century during which it was occupied and suffered destruction.

A merchant city since its origins and a manufacturing city since the 16th century, the Industrial Revolution made it a great industrial capital, mainly around the textile and mechanical industries. Their decline since the 1960s led to a long period of crisis and it was not until the 1990s that the conversion to the tertiary sector and the rehabilitation of the disaster-stricken districts gave the city a different face. It's modern historic center, Old Lille, is characterized by 17th-century red brick town houses, paved pedestrian streets and its central Grand'Place. The belfry of the Hôtel de Ville (City Hall) is one of the 23 belfries in the Nord-Pas-de-Calais and Somme regions that were classified as UNESCO World Heritage Sites in July 2005, in recognition of their architecture and importance to the rise of municipal power in Europe.

The construction of the brand-new Euralille business district in 1988 (the third largest in France) and the arrival of the TGV and then the Eurostar in 1994 made the city easily accessible from major European cities. The development of its international airport, annual events such as the Braderie de Lille in early September (attracting three million visitors), the development of a student and university center (with more than 110,000 students in colleges and schools of the University of Lille and the Catholic University of Lille, the third largest in France behind Paris and Lyon), its ranking as a European Capital of Culture in 2004 and the events of Lille 2004 (European Capital of Culture) and Lille 3000 are the main symbols of this revival. The European metropolis of Lille was awarded the "World Design Capital 2020".

== History ==
=== Origins ===
Archeological digs seem to show the area as inhabited by as early as 2000 BC, most notably in the modern quartiers of Fives, Wazemmes and Vieux Lille. The original inhabitants of the region were the Gauls, such as the Menapians, the Morins, the Atrebates and the Nervians, who were followed by Germanic peoples: the Saxons, the Frisians and the Franks.

The legend of "Lydéric and Phinaert" puts the foundation of the city of Lille at 640. In the 8th century, the language of Old Low Franconian was spoken, as attested by toponymic research. Lille's Dutch name is Rijsel, which comes from ter ijsel (at the island) from Middle Dutch ijssel ("small island, islet"), calque of Old French l'Isle ("the Island"), itself from Latin Īnsula, from īnsula ("island").

From 830 to around 910, the Vikings invaded Flanders. After the destruction caused by Normans' and the Magyars' invasion, the eastern part of the region was ruled by various local princes.

The first mention of the town dates from 1066: apud Insulam (Latin for "at the island"). It was then controlled by the County of Flanders, as were the regional cities (the Roman cities Boulogne, Arras, Cambrai as well as the Carolingian cities Valenciennes, Saint-Omer, Ghent and Bruges). The County of Flanders thus extended to the left bank of the Scheldt, one of the richest and most prosperous regions of Europe.

=== Middle Ages ===
The Carolingian duke Évrard lived in the city in the 9th century and participated in many of the day's political and military affairs. There was an important Battle of Lille in 1054. Raimbert of Lille (fl. c. 1100) was an early nominalist who taught at Lille.

From the 12th century, the fame of the Lille cloth fair began to grow. In 1144 Saint-Sauveur parish was formed, which would give its name to the modern-day quartier Saint-Sauveur.

The counts of Flanders, Boulogne, and Hainaut came together with England and East Frankia and tried to regain territory taken by Philip II of France following Henry II of England's death, a war that ended with the French victory at Bouvines in 1214. Ferdinand, Count of Flanders was imprisoned and the county fell into dispute: it would be his wife, Jeanne, Countess of Flanders and Constantinople, who ruled the city. She was said to be well loved by the residents of Lille, who by that time numbered 10,000.

In 1225, the street performer and juggler Bertrand Cordel, doubtlessly encouraged by local lords, tried to pass himself off as Baldwin I of Constantinople (the father of Jeanne of Flanders), who had disappeared at the battle of Adrianople. He pushed the counties of Flanders and Hainaut towards sedition against Jeanne in order to recover his land. She called her cousin, Louis VIII ("The Lion"). He unmasked the imposter, whom Countess Jeanne quickly had hanged. In 1226 the king agreed to free Infante Ferdinand, Count of Flanders. Count Ferrand died in 1233, and his daughter Marie soon after. In 1235, Jeanne granted a city charter by which city governors would be chosen each All Saint's Day by four commissioners chosen by the ruler. On 6 February 1236, she founded the Countess's Hospital (Hospice Comtesse). It was in her honour that the hospital of the Regional Medical University of Lille was named "Jeanne of Flanders Hospital" in the 20th century.

The Countess died in 1244 in the Abbey of Marquette, leaving no heirs. The rule of Flanders and Hainaut thus fell to her sister, Margaret II of Flanders, then to Margaret's son, Guy of Dampierre. Lille fell under the rule of France from 1304 to 1369, after the Franco-Flemish War (1297–1305).

The county of Flanders fell to the Burgundian State next, after the 1369 marriage of Margaret III of Flanders, and Philip the Bold, Duke of Burgundy. Lille thus became one of the three capitals of said Duchy, along with Brussels and Dijon. By 1445, Lille counted some 25,000 residents. Philip the Good, Duke of Burgundy, was even more powerful than the king of France, and made Lille an administrative and financial capital.

On 17 February 1454, one year after the taking of Constantinople by the Turks, Philip the Good organised a Pantagruelian banquet at his Lille palace, the still-celebrated "Feast of the Pheasant". There the Duke and his court undertook an oath to Christianity.

In 1477, at the death of the last duke of Burgundy, Charles the Bold, Mary of Burgundy married Maximilian of Austria, who thus became Count of Flanders.

=== Early modern era ===
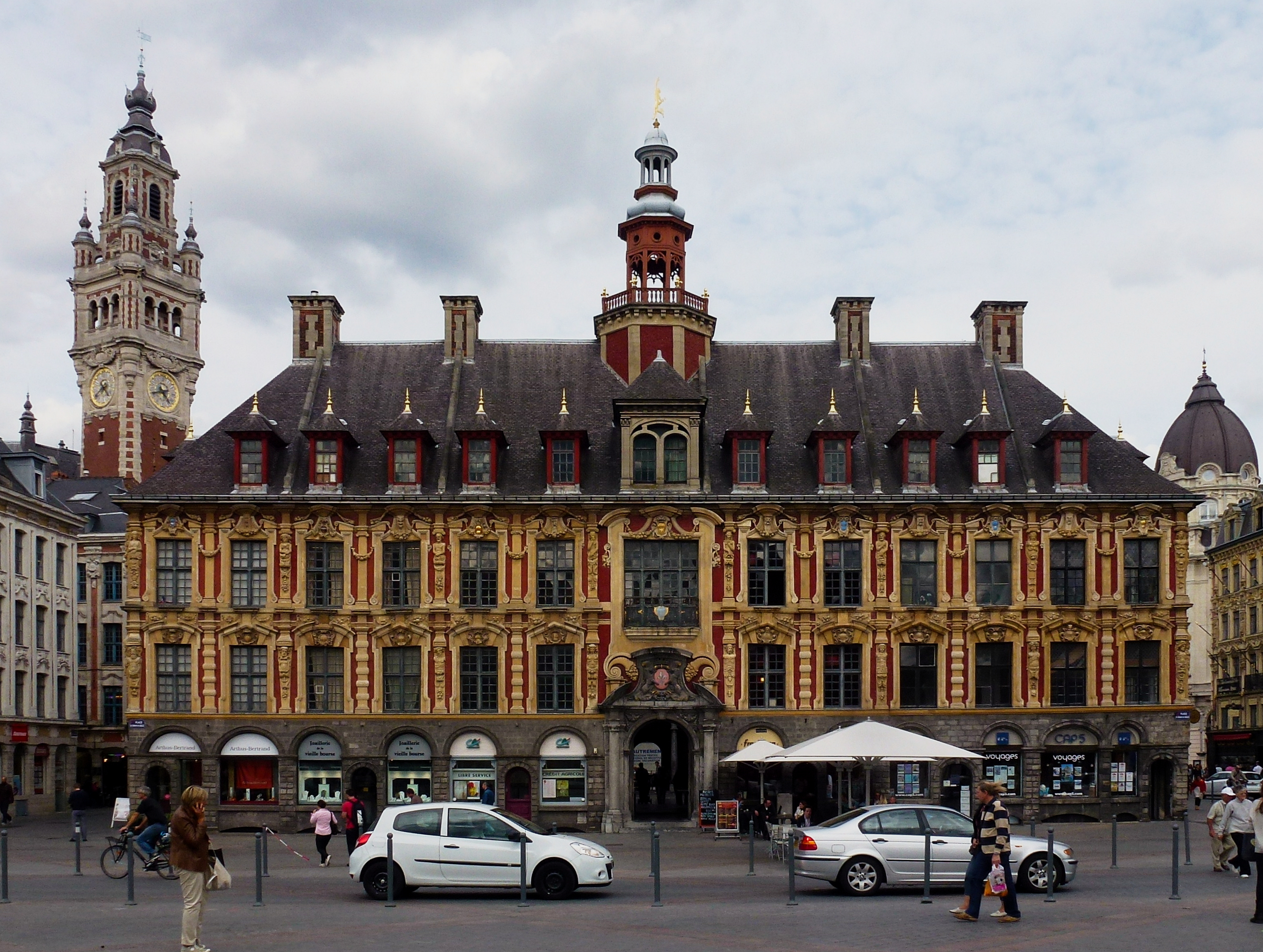
The Vieille Bourse on the Grand' Place

The 16th and 17th centuries were marked by a boom in the regional textile industry, the Protestant revolts and outbreaks of the Black Death.

Lille came under the rule of the Charles V, Holy Roman Emperor in 1519. The Low Countries fell to his eldest son, Philip II of Spain, in 1555. The city remained under Spanish Habsburg rule until 1668. Reformed Christianity first appeared in the area in 1542, and by 1555, the authorities were taking steps to suppress that form of Protestantism. In 1566, the countryside around Lille was affected by the Beeldenstorm. In 1578, the Hurlus, a group of Protestant rebels, stormed the castle of the Counts of Mouscron. They were removed four months later by a Catholic Wallon regiment, and they tried several times between 1581 and 1582 to take the city of Lille, all in vain. The Hurlus were notably held back by the legendary Jeanne Maillotte.

Also in 1581, at the call of Elizabeth I of the Kingdom of England, the north of the Seventeen Provinces, having gained a Protestant majority, successfully revolted and formed the Dutch Republic. The war brought or exacerbated periods of famine and plague (the last in 1667–1679).

The first printer to set up shop in Lille was Antoine Tack in 1594. The 17th century saw the building of new institutions: an Irish College in 1610, a Jesuit college in 1611, an Augustinian college in 1622, almshouses or hospitals such as the Maison des Vieux hommes in 1624 and the Bonne et Forte Maison des Pauvres in 1661, and of a Mont-de-piété in 1626.

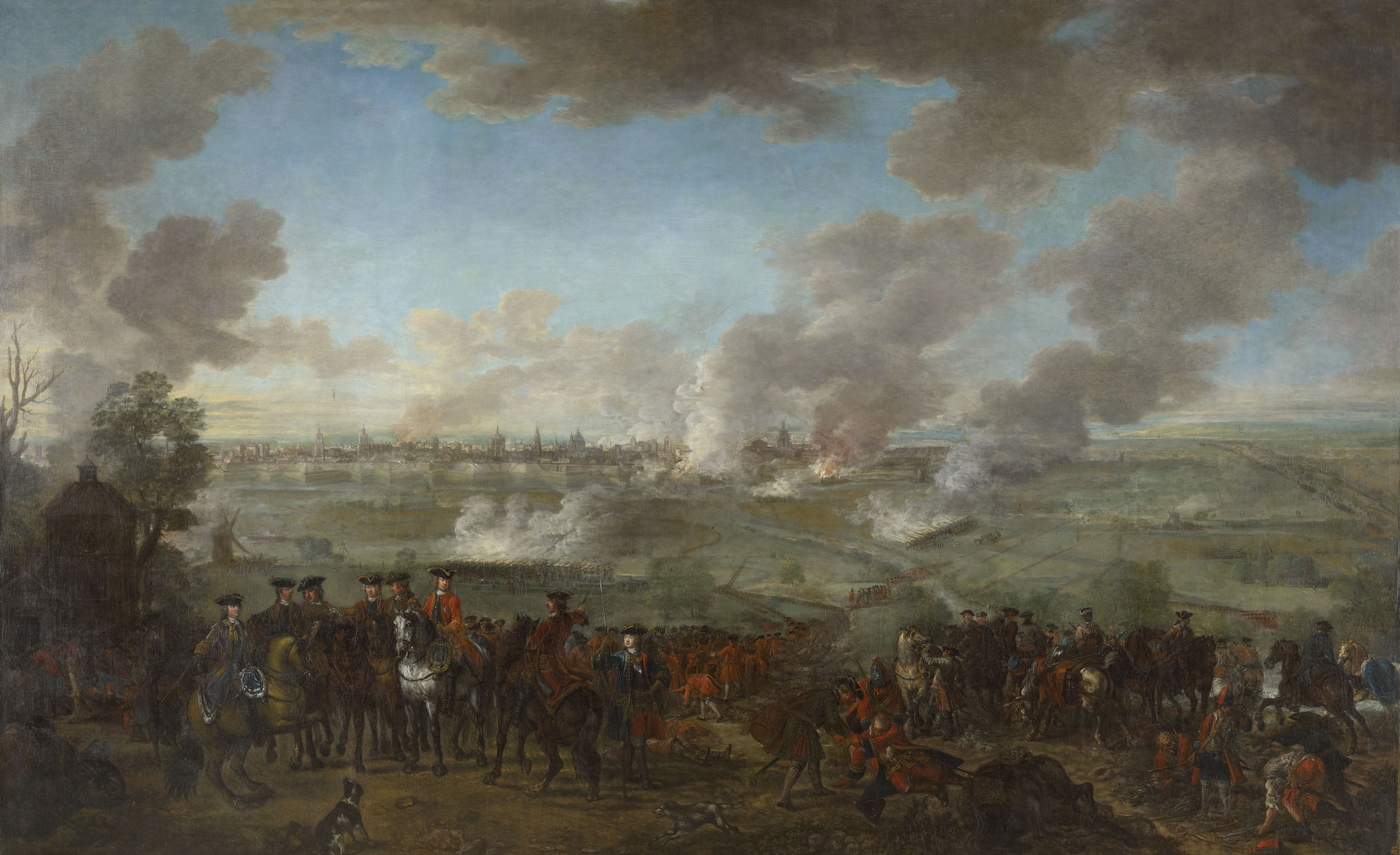
Siege of Lille in 1708, by John Wootton.

Unsuccessful French attacks on the city were launched in 1641 and 1645. In 1667, Louis XIV successfully laid siege to Lille, resulting in it becoming French in 1668 under the Treaty of Aix-la-Chapelle, provoking discontent among the citizens of the prosperous city. A number of important public works undertaken between 1667 and 1670, such as when Sébastien Le Prestre, Marquis of Vauban build the Citadel of Lille, or the creation of the quartiers of Saint-André and la Madeleine, enabled the French king to gradually gain the confidence of his new subjects in Lille, some of whom continued to feel Flemish, but they had always spoken the Romance Picard language.

In 1708, during the War of the Spanish Succession, the Grand Alliance managed to capture Lille. For five years, from 1708 to 1713, the Dutch continued to occupy the city. Throughout the 18th century, Lille remained a profoundly Catholic city. It took little part in the French Revolution, but there were riots and the destruction of churches. In 1790, the city held its first municipal elections.

=== Post-French Revolution ===
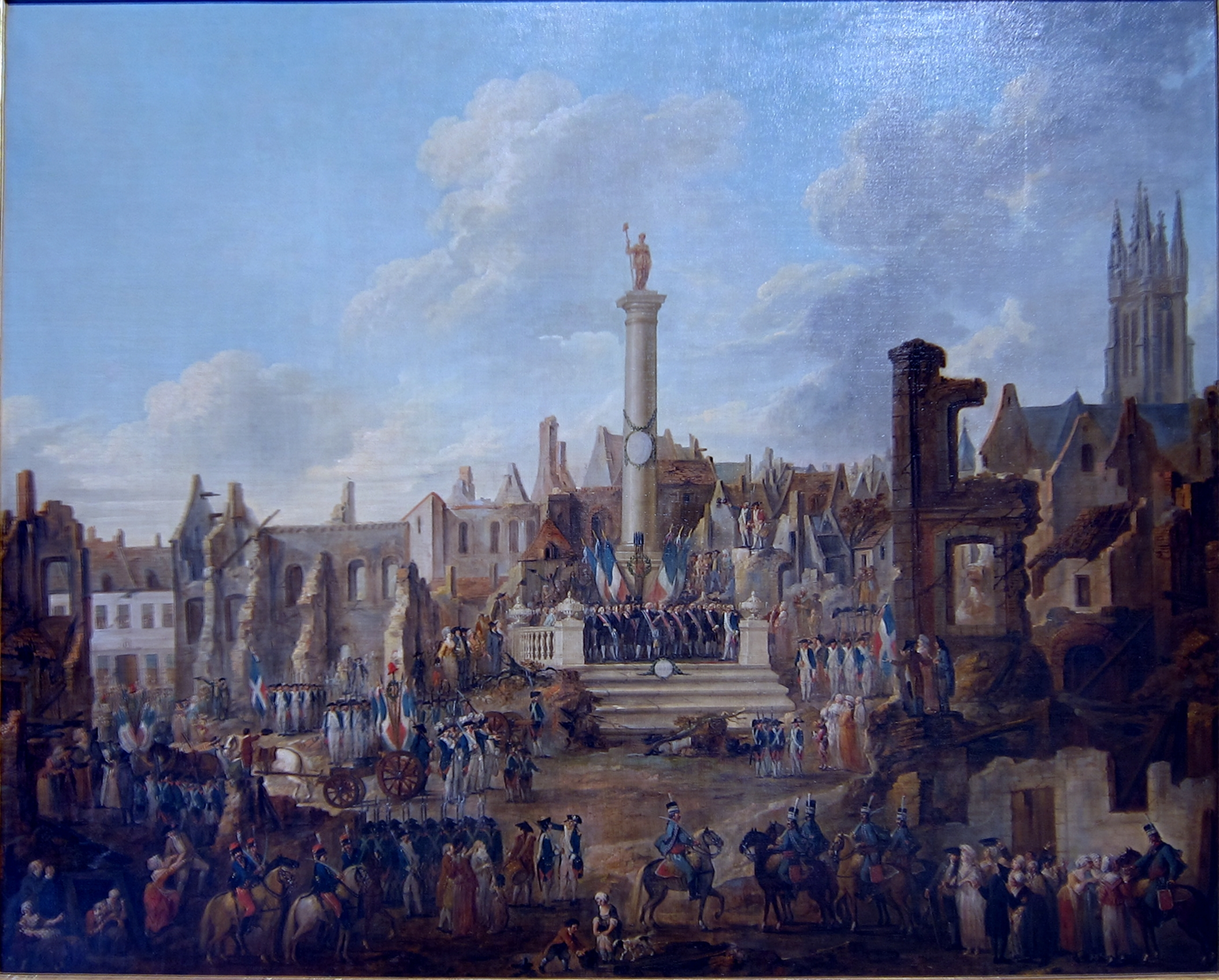
Lille in 1793

In 1792, in the aftermath of the French Revolution, the Austrians, then in the United Provinces, laid siege to Lille. The "Column of the Goddess", erected in 1842 in the "Grand-Place" (officially named Place du Général-de-Gaulle), is a tribute to the city's resistance, led by Mayor François André-Bonte. Although Austrian artillery destroyed many houses and the main church of the city, the city did not surrender, and the Austrian Army left after eight days.

The city continued to grow and, by 1800, had some 53,000 residents, leading to Lille becoming the seat of the Nord département in 1804. In 1846, a railway connecting Paris and Lille was built. In the early 19th century, Napoleon I's continental blockade against the United Kingdom led to Lille's textile industry developing even more fully. The city was known for its cotton while the nearby towns of Roubaix and Tourcoing worked wool. Leisure activities were thoroughly organised in 1858 for the 80,000 inhabitants. Cabarets or taverns for the working class numbered 1,300, or one for every three houses. At that time the city counted 63 drinking and singing clubs, 37 clubs for card players, 23 for bowling, 13 for skittles, and 18 for archery. The churches likewise have their social organizations. Each club had a long roster of officers, and a busy schedule of banquets festivals and competitions. In 1853, Alexandre Desrousseaux composed his lullaby "P'tit quinquin".

In 1858, Lille annexed the adjacent towns of Esquermes, Fives, Moulins-Lille and Wazemmes. Lille's population was 158,000 in 1872, growing to over 200,000 by 1891. In 1896 Lille became the first city in France to be led by a socialist, Gustave Delory.

By 1912, Lille's population stood at 217,000. The city profited from the Industrial Revolution, particularly via coal and the steam engine. The entire region grew wealthy thanks to its mines and textile industry.

=== First World War ===
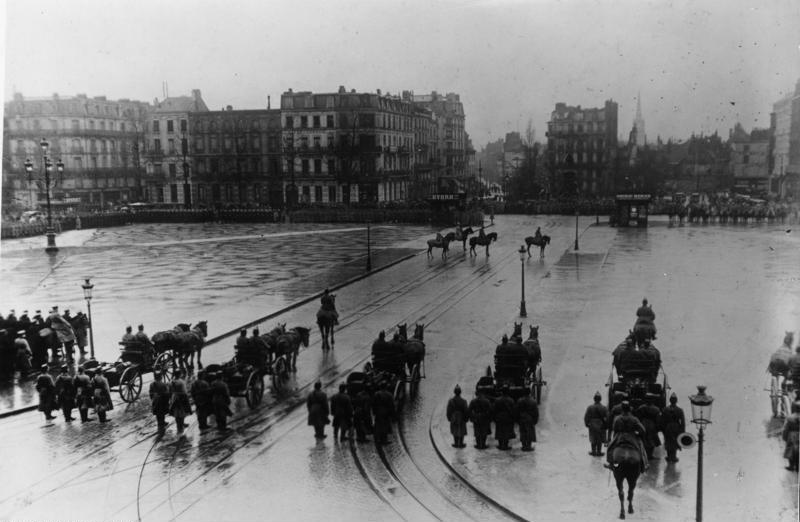
German military parade in Lille, 1915

Lille's occupation by the Germans began on 13 October 1914 after a ten-day siege and heavy shelling, which destroyed 882 apartment and office blocks and 1,500 houses, mostly around the railway station and in the centre. By the end of October, the city was being run by German authorities. Because Lille was only 20 kilometres (12 mi) from the battlefield, German troops passed through the city regularly on their way to and from the front. As a result, occupied Lille became a place for the hospitalisation and the treatment of wounded soldiers as well as a place for soldiers' relaxation and entertainment. Many buildings, homes and businesses were requisitioned to those ends.

Lille was liberated by the Allies on 17 October 1918, when General William Birdwood and his troops were welcomed by joyous crowds. The general was made an honorary citizen of the city of Lille on 28 October.

The only audio recording known to have been made during World War I was recorded near Lille in October 1918. The two-minute recording captured the Royal Garrison Artillery conducting a gas shell bombardment.

Lille was also the hunting ground of the German World War I flying ace Max Immelmann, who was nicknamed "the Eagle of Lille".

=== Années Folles, Great Depression and Popular Front ===
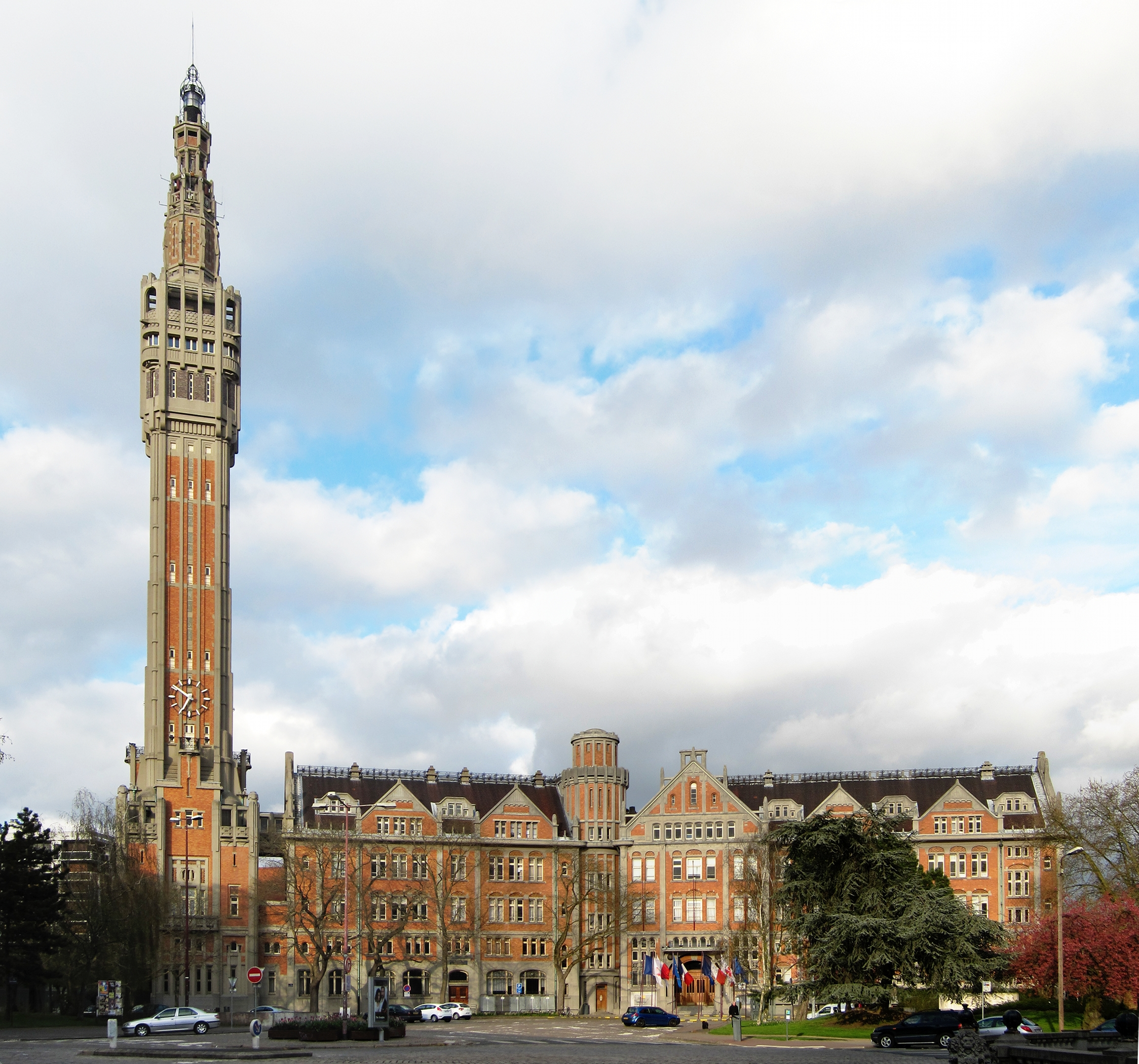
Lille's Art Deco Town Hall (1932)

In July 1921, at the Pasteur Institute in Lille, Albert Calmette and Camille Guérin discovered the first anti-tuberculosis vaccine, known as BCG ("Bacille de Calmette et Guérin"). The Opéra de Lille, designed by Lille architect Louis M. Cordonnier, was dedicated in 1923.

From 1931, Lille felt the repercussions of the Great Depression, and by 1935, a third of the city's population lived in poverty. In 1936, the city's mayor, Roger Salengro, became Minister of the Interior of the Popular Front but eventually killed himself after right-wing groups led a slanderous campaign against him.

=== Second World War ===
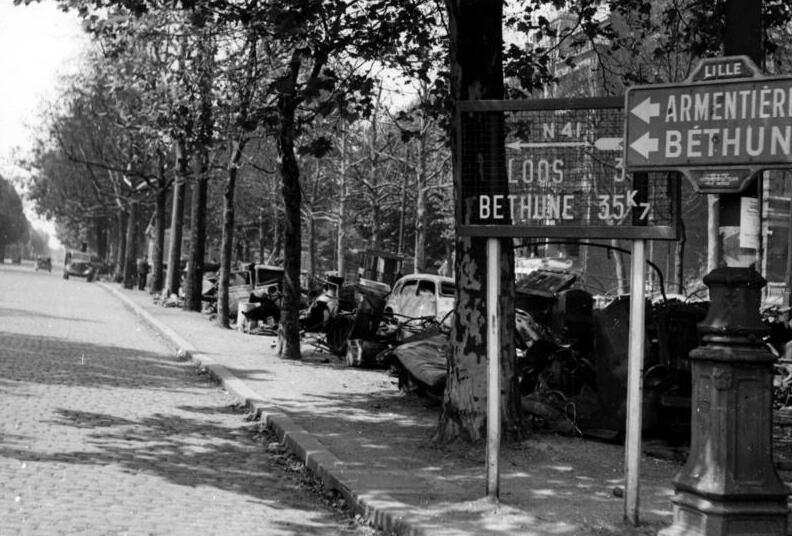
Wrecked vehicles in Lille, after the 1940 siege of the city

During the Battle of France, Lille was besieged by German forces for several days. When Belgium was invaded, the citizens of Lille, still haunted by the events of World War I, began to flee the city in large numbers. Lille was part of the zone under control of the German commander in Brussels, and was never controlled by the Vichy government in France. Lille was instead controlled under the military administration in Northern France. The départements of Nord and Pas-de-Calais (with the exception of the coast, notably Dunkirk) were for the most part liberated from 1 to 5 September 1944, by British, Canadian and Polish troops. On 3 September, German troops began to leave Lille out of fear of the British, who were on their way from Brussels. The city was liberated by a British force consisting largely of tanks.

Rationing came to an end in 1947, and by 1948, normality had returned to Lille.

=== Postwar ===
The Euralille quarter

In 1967, the Chamber of Commerce of Lille, Roubaix and Tourcoing were joined, and in 1969 the Communauté urbaine de Lille (Lille urban community) was created, linking 87 communes with Lille.

Throughout the 1960s and the 1970s, the region was faced with some problems after the decline of the coal, mining and textile industries. From the early 1980s, the city began to turn itself more towards the service sector.

Pierre Mauroy served as Mayor of Lille for 28 years from 1973 to 2001. Mauroy was Prime Minister for part of the term of Francois Mitterrand.

In 1983, the VAL, the world's first automated rapid transit underground network, opened. In 1993, a high-speed TGV train line was opened connecting Paris with Lille in one hour. This, with the opening of the Channel Tunnel in 1994 and the arrival of the Eurostar train put Lille at the centre of a triangle connecting Paris, London and Brussels.

Work on Euralille, an urban remodelling project, began in 1991. The Euralille Centre was opened in 1994, and the remodeled district is now full of parks and modern buildings containing offices, shops and apartments. In 1994 the "Grand Palais" was also opened for the general public, which is free for the public to enter on the first Sunday of every month.

=== 21st century ===
Lille was chosen as a European Capital of Culture in 2004, along with the Italian city of Genoa.

Lille and Roubaix were affected by the 2005 riots, like all of France's other urban centres.

In 2007 and again in 2010, Lille was awarded the label "Internet City".

The Saint-Joseph Chapel of Saint-Paul College was demolished in February 2021.

== Climate ==
Lille can be described as having a temperate oceanic climate; summers normally do not reach high average temperatures, but winters can fall below freezing temperatures, though with averages still above the freezing mark. Precipitation is plentiful year round.

The table below gives average temperatures and precipitation levels for the 1991–2020 reference period.

Climate data for Lille - Lesquin (LIL), elevation: 47 m (154 ft) (1991–2020 normals, extremes 1944–present)
Month	Jan	Feb	Mar	Apr	May	Jun	Jul	Aug	Sep	Oct	Nov	Dec	Year
Record high °C (°F)	15.2 (59.4)	19.0 (66.2)	24.8 (76.6)	27.9 (82.2)	31.7 (89.1)	37.0 (98.6)	41.5 (106.7)	38.5 (101.3)	35.1 (95.2)	27.8 (82.0)	20.3 (68.5)	16.1 (61.0)	41.5 (106.7)
Mean daily maximum °C (°F)	6.6 (43.9)	7.5 (45.5)	11.2 (52.2)	15.0 (59.0)	18.4 (65.1)	21.3 (70.3)	23.7 (74.7)	23.7 (74.7)	20.2 (68.4)	15.4 (59.7)	10.3 (50.5)	7.0 (44.6)	15.0 (59.0)
Daily mean °C (°F)	4.1 (39.4)	4.7 (40.5)	7.5 (45.5)	10.5 (50.9)	13.8 (56.8)	16.7 (62.1)	18.9 (66.0)	18.8 (65.8)	15.8 (60.4)	11.9 (53.4)	7.6 (45.7)	4.7 (40.5)	11.3 (52.3)
Mean daily minimum °C (°F)	1.7 (35.1)	1.9 (35.4)	3.8 (38.8)	5.9 (42.6)	9.3 (48.7)	12.1 (53.8)	14.2 (57.6)	14.0 (57.2)	11.4 (52.5)	8.4 (47.1)	4.9 (40.8)	2.3 (36.1)	7.5 (45.5)
Record low °C (°F)	−19.5 (−3.1)	−17.8 (0.0)	−10.5 (13.1)	−4.7 (23.5)	−2.3 (27.9)	0.0 (32.0)	3.4 (38.1)	3.9 (39.0)	1.2 (34.2)	−4.4 (24.1)	−7.8 (18.0)	−17.3 (0.9)	−19.5 (−3.1)
Average precipitation mm (inches)	58.2 (2.29)	50.8 (2.00)	52.1 (2.05)	45.3 (1.78)	61.6 (2.43)	63.7 (2.51)	67.8 (2.67)	71.3 (2.81)	56.8 (2.24)	64.1 (2.52)	75.0 (2.95)	73.3 (2.89)	740.0 (29.13)
Average precipitation days (≥ 1.0 mm)	11.2	10.6	10.1	9.2	9.5	9.8	9.9	9.9	9.7	10.8	13.3	12.2	126.2
Average snowy days	4.2	5.2	3.0	1.0	0.1	0.0	0.0	0.0	0.0	0.0	1.4	3.7	18.6
Average relative humidity (%)	88	84	78	72	72	72	72	73	78	84	89	89	79
Average dew point °C (°F)	2 (36)	2 (36)	3 (37)	5 (41)	8 (46)	11 (52)	13 (55)	13 (55)	11 (52)	9 (48)	6 (43)	3 (37)	7 (45)
Mean monthly sunshine hours	62.2	73.6	127.3	175.9	195.7	201.5	209.7	196.8	155.3	115.3	61.7	52.5	1,627.4
Source 1: Meteociel (snowy days 1981-2010)
Source 2: Time and Date

== Environment ==
Lille is noted for its air pollution., with a 2018 study attributing 1,700 deaths per year in the agglomeration of Lille to pollution. In 2018, Lille held France's record pollution peaks.

== Population ==
The population data in the table and graph to the left below refer to the commune of Lille proper in its borders since 2000, i.e. a municipal territory of 35 km^{2} (14 sq mi). This includes the former communes annexed by the commune of Lille: Esquermes, Fives, Moulins-Lille, and Wazemmes in 1858, Hellemmes-Lille in 1977, and Lomme in 2000.

The Lille metropolitan area (table to the right below), which is much larger than the small commune of Lille proper, covers a territory of 1,666 km^{2} (643 sq mi) (French part of the metropolitan area only) and had a population of 1,528,848 in 2022.

Population of the commune of Lille (35 km^{2})
(within 2020 borders)

Year	Pop.	±% p.a.
1806	71,067	—
1821	75,070	+0.37%
1831	83,588	+1.08%
1836	88,112	+1.00%
1841	90,882	+0.62%
1846	99,099	+1.72%
1851	104,017	+0.97%
1856	116,738	+2.45%
1861	135,944	+3.05%
1866	160,508	+3.38%
1872	164,355	+0.40%
1876	169,686	+0.71%
1881	186,388	+1.84%
1886	197,963	+1.34%
1891	211,884	+1.41%
1896	228,920	+1.57%
1901	227,090	−0.16%
1906	225,725	−0.12%

Year	Pop.	±% p.a.
1911	240,799	+1.30%
1921	225,603	−0.65%
1926	236,134	+0.92%
1931	240,348	+0.35%
1936	240,747	+0.03%
1946	221,480	−0.83%
1954	236,284	+0.79%
1962	239,955	+0.20%
1968	238,554	−0.10%
1975	219,204	−1.21%
1982	196,705	−1.53%
1990	198,691	+0.13%
1999	226,014	+1.44%
2007	225,789	−0.01%
2012	228,652	+0.25%
2017	232,787	+0.36%
2023	238,246	+0.39%

Source: EHESS and INSEE

Population of the Lille metropolitan area (1,666 km^{2})
(201 communes, within 2020 borders)

Year	Pop.	±% p.a.
1806	370,322	—
1821	395,338	+0.44%
1831	434,838	+0.96%
1836	452,668	+0.76%
1841	472,634	+0.87%
1846	502,181	+1.20%
1851	519,591	+0.68%
1856	549,796	+1.19%
1861	608,512	+2.02%
1866	678,660	+2.21%
1872	710,385	+0.76%
1876	747,544	+1.14%
1881	792,750	+1.14%
1886	839,849	+1.28%
1891	892,240	+1.25%
1896	948,958	+1.25%
1901	979,033	+0.63%

Year	Pop.	±% p.a.
1906	994,319	+0.31%
1911	1,031,986	+0.75%
1921	918,777	−1.16%
1926	1,018,284	+2.08%
1931	1,064,589	+0.89%
1936	1,063,592	−0.02%
1946	1,030,730	−0.31%
1954	1,109,301	+0.90%
1962	1,195,774	+0.96%
1968	1,270,361	+1.01%
1975	1,326,496	+0.62%
1982	1,344,998	+0.20%
1990	1,390,191	+0.41%
1999	1,425,497	+0.28%
2009	1,454,449	+0.20%
2014	1,487,003	+0.44%
2020	1,515,061	+0.31%

Source: EHESS and INSEE

== Economy ==
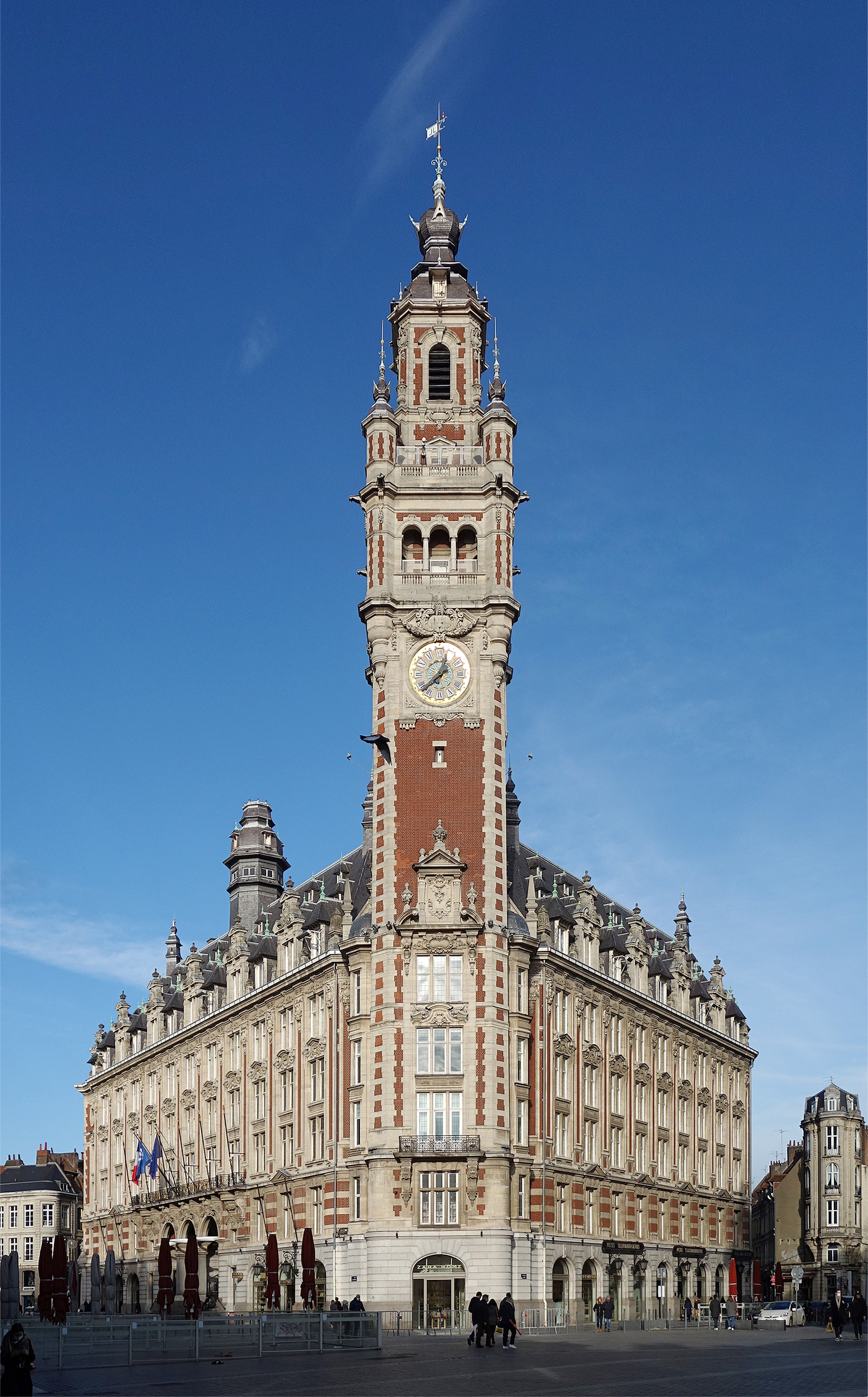
Lille's Chamber of Commerce

A former major mechanical, food industry and textile manufacturing centre as well as a retail and finance center, Lille is the largest city of a conurbation, built like a network of cities: Lille, Roubaix, Tourcoing and Villeneuve-d'Ascq. The conurbation forms the Métropole Européenne de Lille which is France's fourth-largest urban conglomeration with a 2016 population of over 1.15 million.

=== Revenues and taxes ===
For centuries, Lille, a city of merchants, has displayed a wide range of incomes: great wealth and poverty have lived side by side, especially until the end of the 1800s. This contrast was noted by Victor Hugo in 1851 in his poem Les Châtiments: « Caves de Lille ! on meurt sous vos plafonds de pierre ! » ("Cellars of Lille! We die under your stone ceilings!")

=== Employment ===
Employment in Lille has switched over half a century from a predominant industry to tertiary activities and services. Services account for 91% of employment in 2006.

Employment in Lille from 1968 to 2015

Business area	1968	1975	1982	1990	1999	2015
Agriculture	340	240	144	116	175	74
Industry and construction	51,900	43,500	34,588	22,406	15,351	8,427
Tertiary activities	91,992	103,790	107,916	114,992	122,736	149,795
Total	144,232	147,530	142,648	137,514	138,262	158,296
Sources of data: INSEE

Employment per categories in 1968 and in 2017

	Farmers		Businesspersons, entrepreneurs		Upper class		Middle class		Employees		Blue-collar worker	
	1968	2017	1968	2017	1968	2017	1968	2017	1968	2017	1968	2017
Lille	0.1%	0.0%	7.8%	3.6%	7.5%	29.0%	16.7%	26.0%	33.1%	25.0%	34.9%	13.4%
France	12.5%	1.3%	9.9%	6.0%	5.2%	16.3%	12.4%	24.8%	22.5%	28.5%	37.6%	21.5%
Sources of data : INSEE

Unemployment in active population from 1968 to 2017

	1968	1975	1982	1990	1999	2007	2017
Lille	2.9%	4.6%	10.3%	14.6%	16.9%	16.7%	19.2%
France	2.1%	3.8%	7.4%	10.1%	11.7%	11.5%	13.9%
Sources of data : INSEE

=== Enterprises ===
At the end of 2015, Lille hosts around 28,000 industry or service establishments.

Enterprises as per 31 December 2015

	Enterprises	Number of employees					Total employees
	Enterprises	None	1 to 9	10 to 19	20 to 49	50+	Total employees
Agriculture	20	17	2	0	0	1	74
Industries	804	543	186	27	23	25	5423
Construction	1606	1247	282	45	24	8	3004
Commerce, transports, services	16410	11742	3721	477	294	176	55707
Car sales and repair	4815	3105	1495	138	48	29	12962
Administration, education, health, social work	4536	3357	599	196	181	203	81126
Total	28191	20011	6285	883	570	442	158296
Source of data : INSEE

== Main sights ==
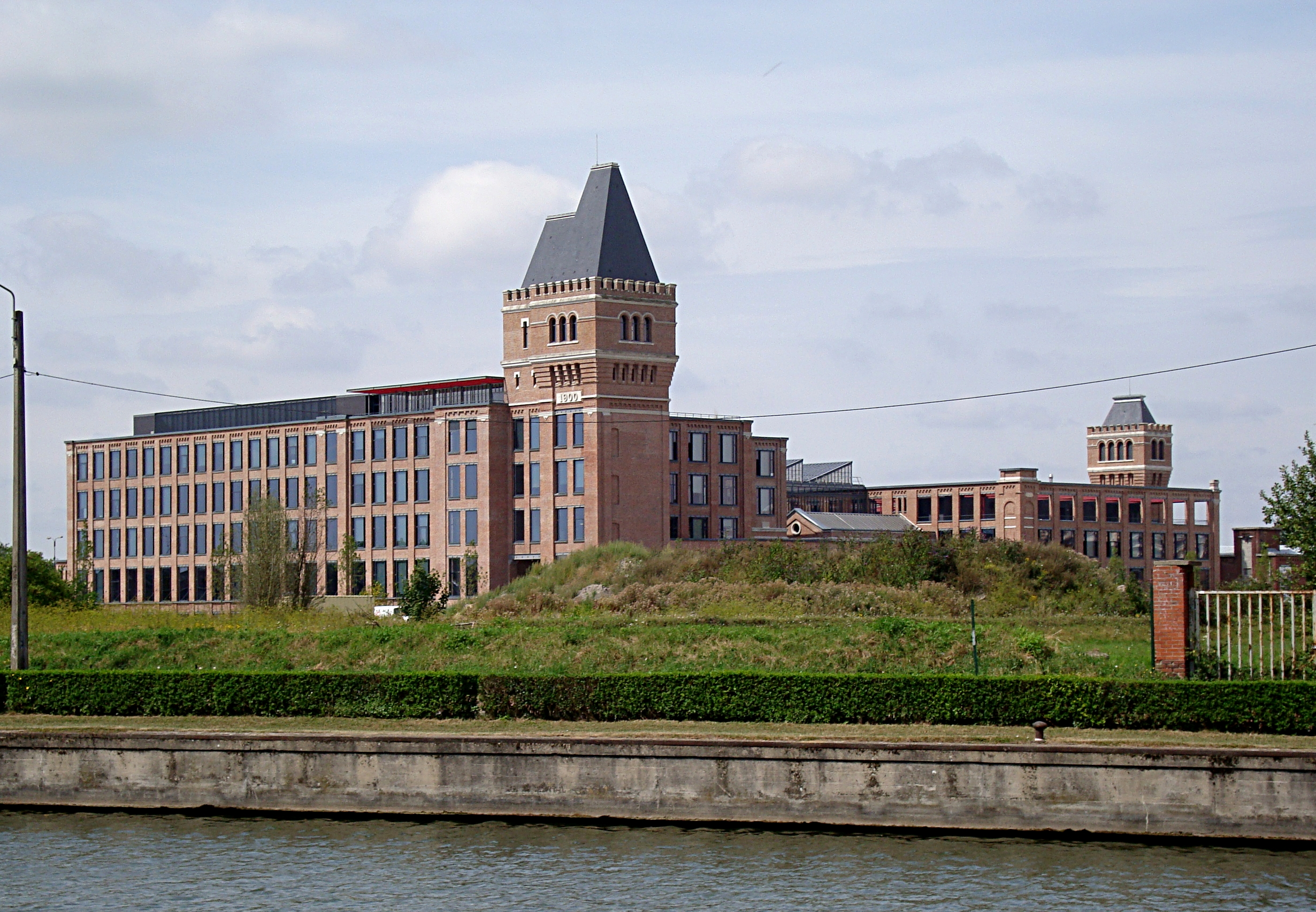
EuraTechnologies cluster

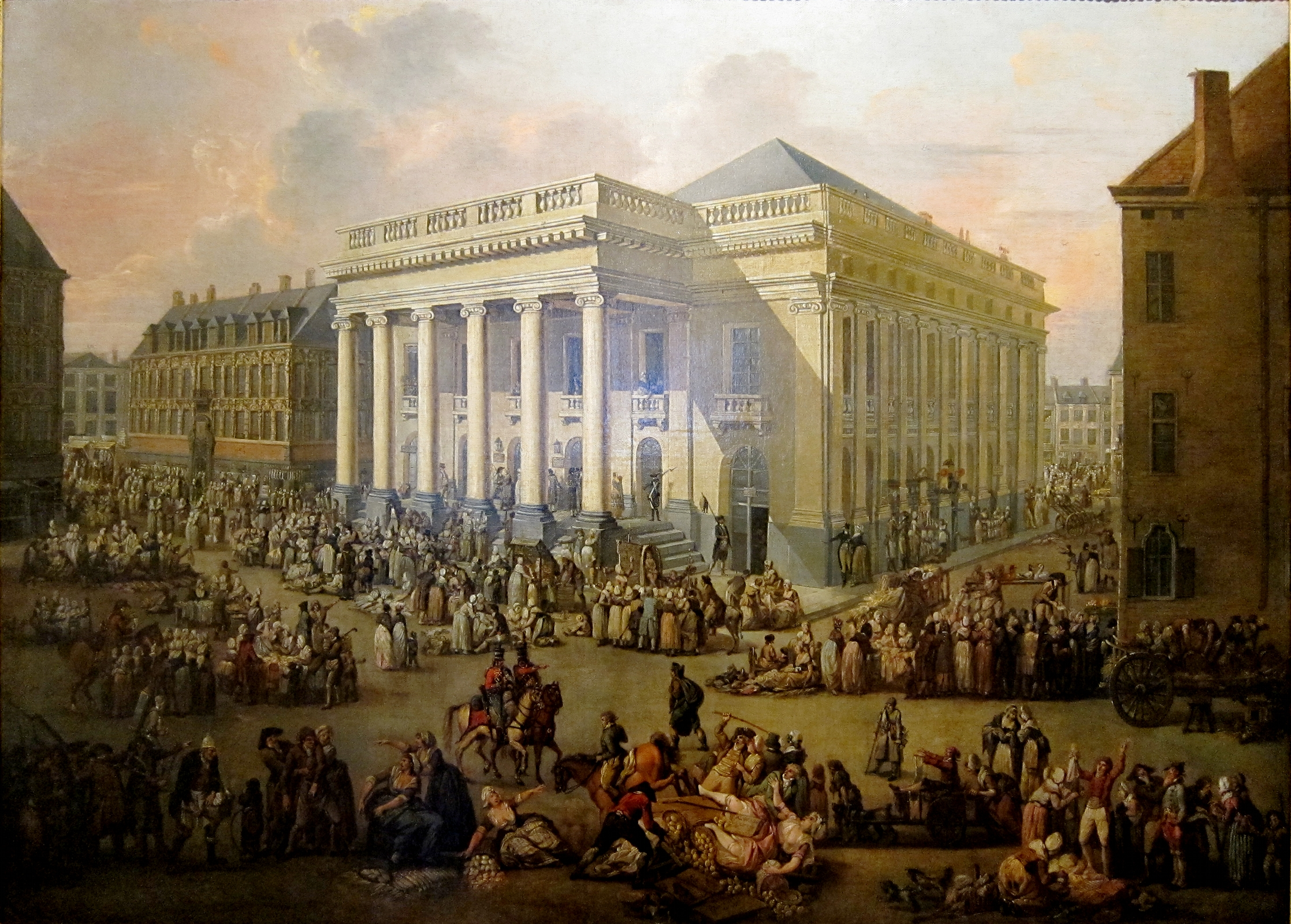
La Braderie by François Watteau

Lille features an array of architectural styles with various amounts of Flemish influence, including the use of brown and red brick. In addition, many residential neighborhoods, especially in Greater Lille, consist of attached two- to three-storey houses aligned in a row, with narrow gardens in the back. These architectural attributes, many uncommon in France, help make Lille a transition in France to neighboring Belgium, as well as nearby Netherlands and England, where the presence of brick, as well as row houses or the terraced house is much more prominent.

Points of interest include

- Birthplace of Charles de Gaulle
- Lille Cathedral (Basilique-cathédrale Notre-Dame-de-la-Treille)
- Citadel of Lille
- Palais des Beaux-Arts de Lille
- Jardin botanique de la Faculté de Pharmacie
- Jardin botanique Nicolas Boulay
- Jardin des Plantes de Lille
- Maison Folie Moulins
- Lille Synagogue

=== La Braderie ===
Lille hosts an annual braderie on the first weekend in September. Its origins are thought to date back to the twelfth century and between two and three million visitors are drawn into the city. It is one of the largest gatherings of France and the largest flea market in Europe.

Many of the roads in the inner city (including much of the old town) are closed and local shops, residents and traders set up stalls in the street. The food of choice during the braderie is Moules frites, or mussels with french fries.

== Gallery ==
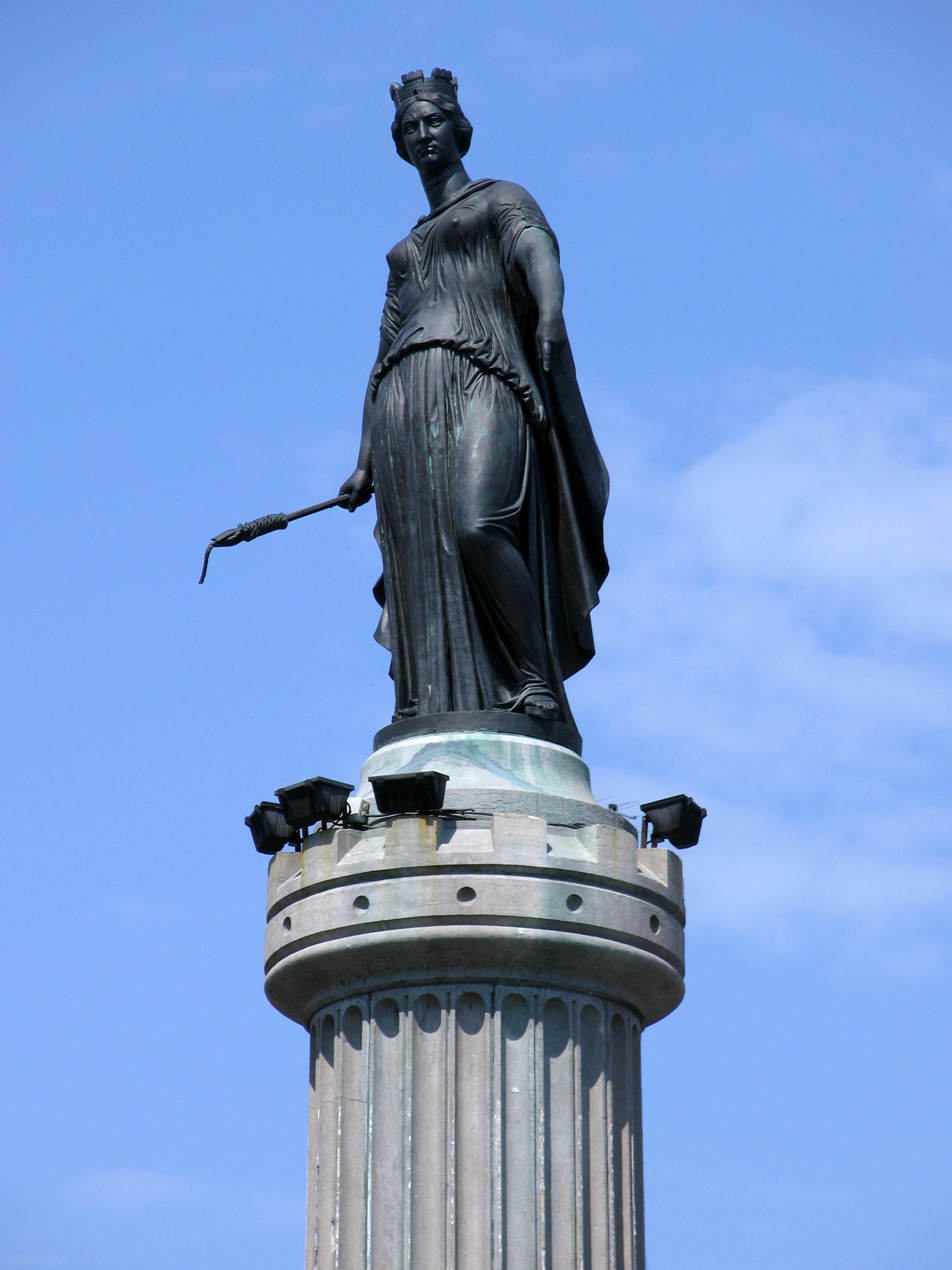
Column of the Goddess

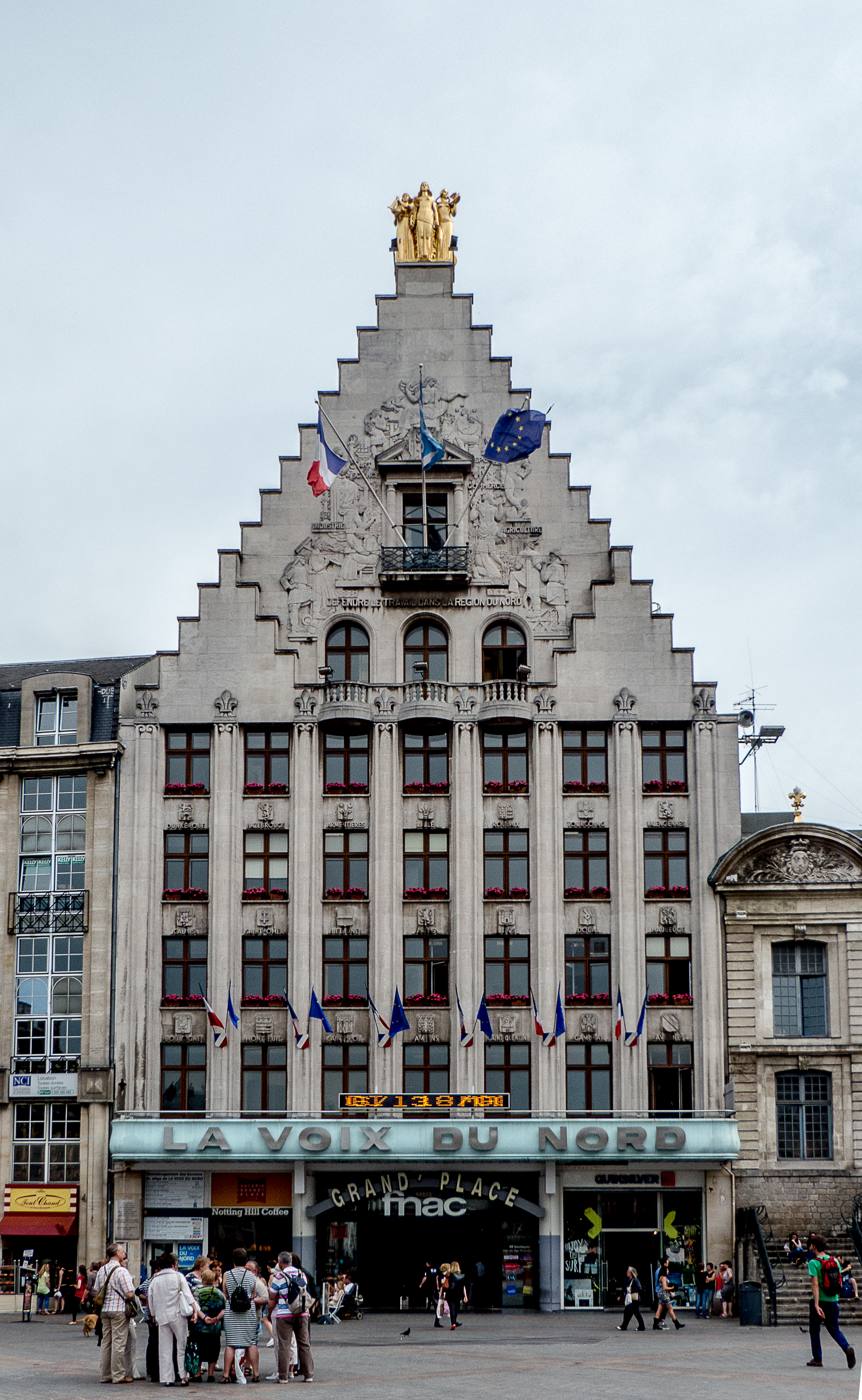
Lille Grand Place. La Voix du Nord (newspaper offices)

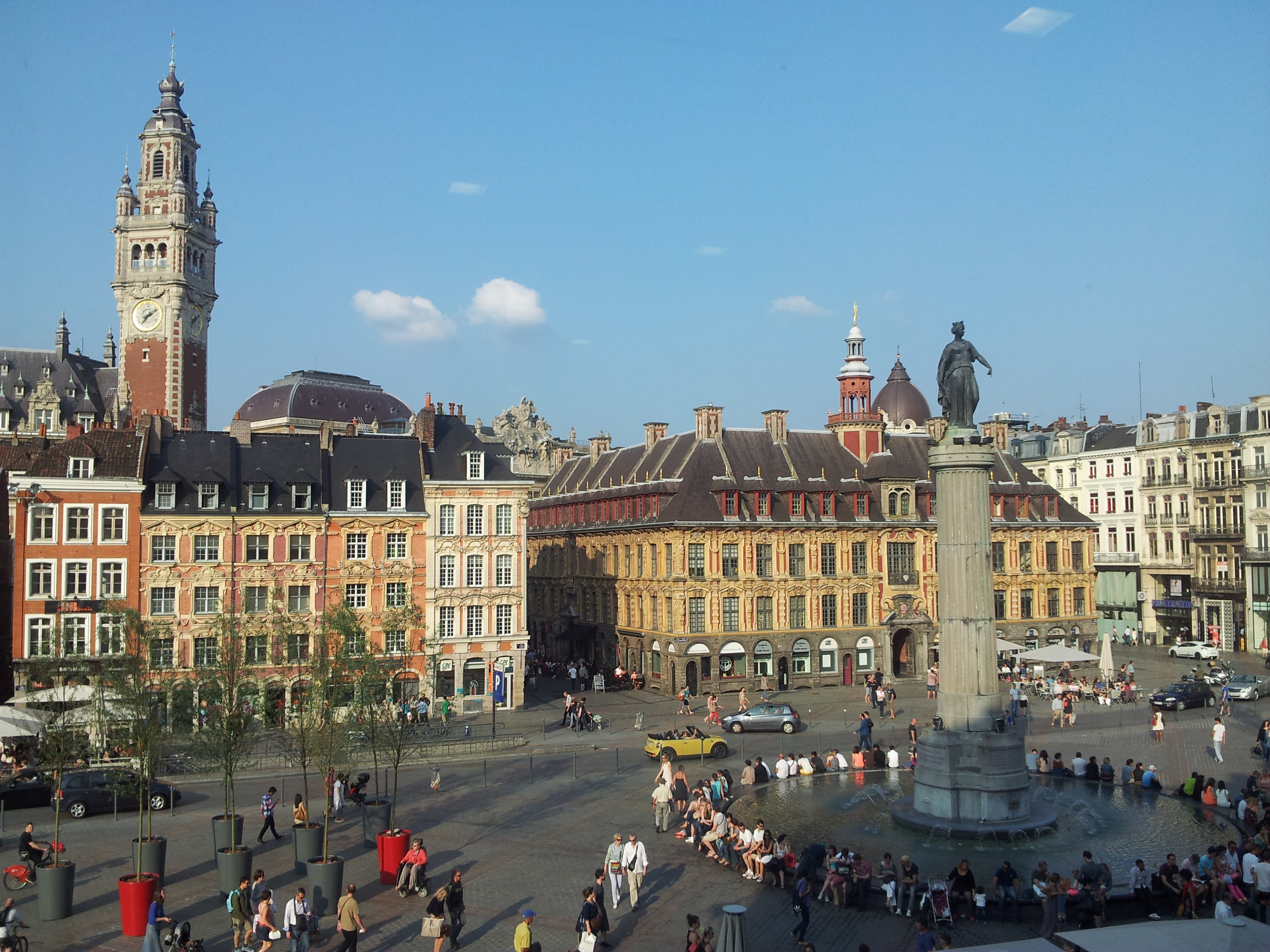
Lille Grand Place

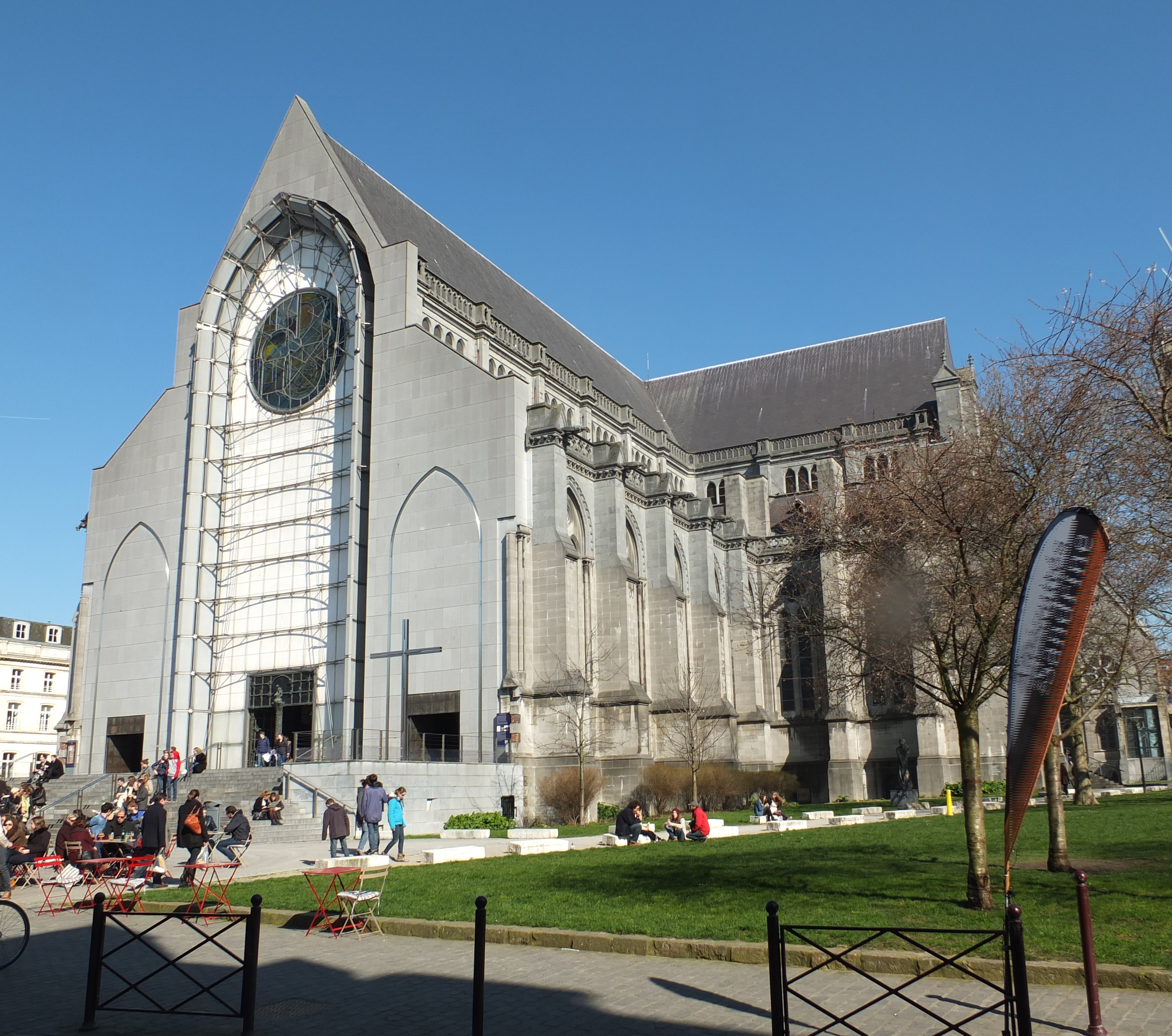
Lille Cathedral

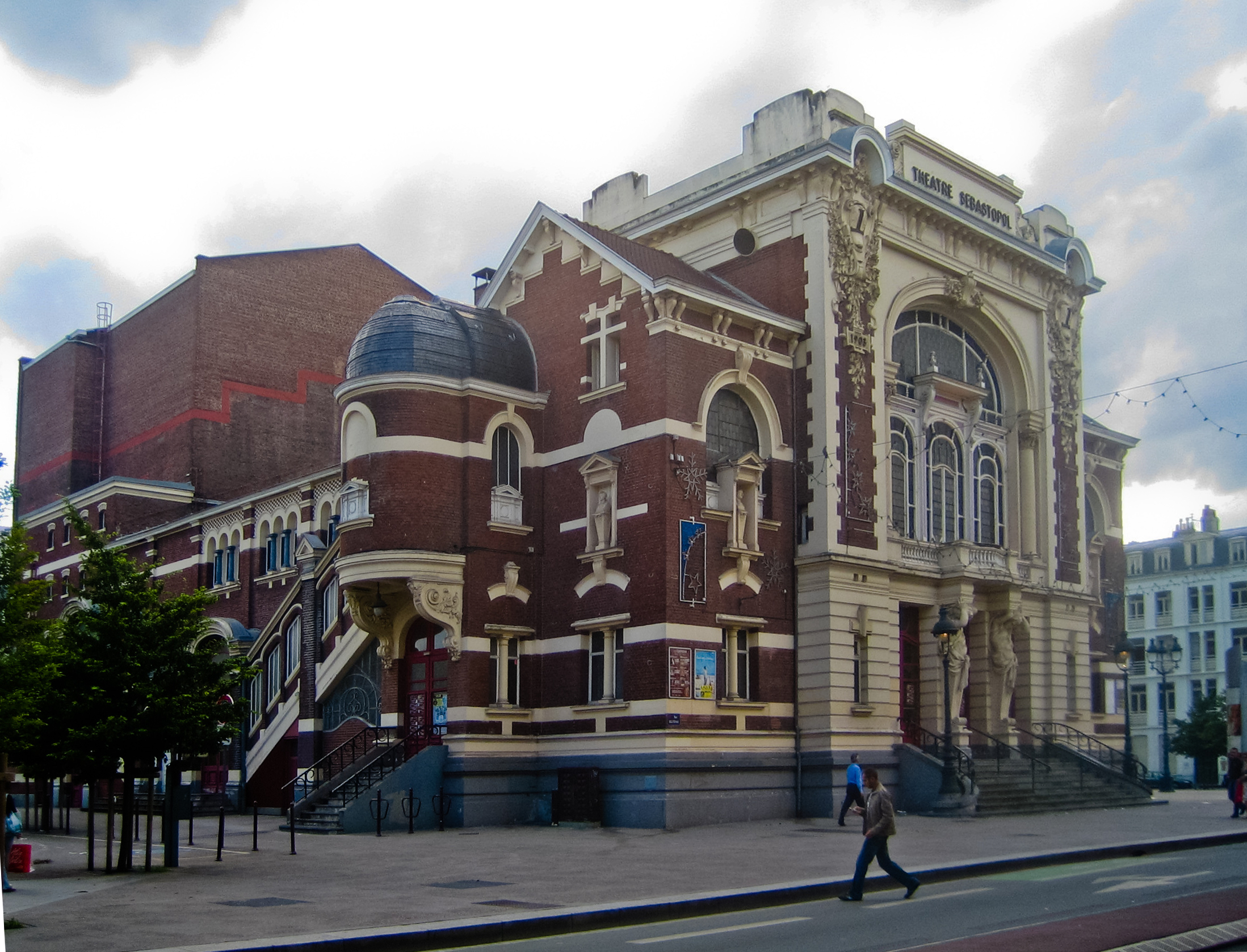
Théâtre Sébastopol

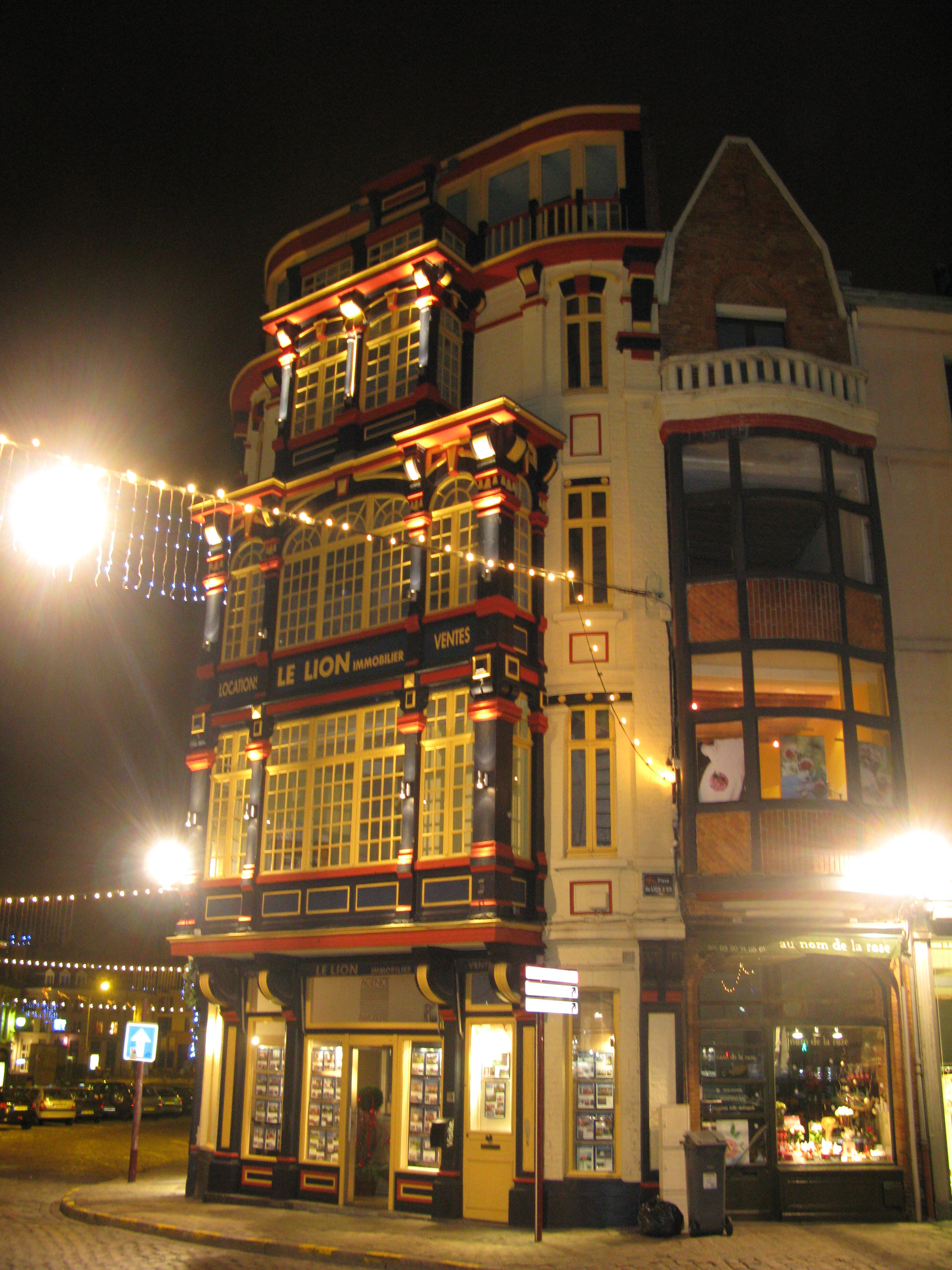
Lion d'or square

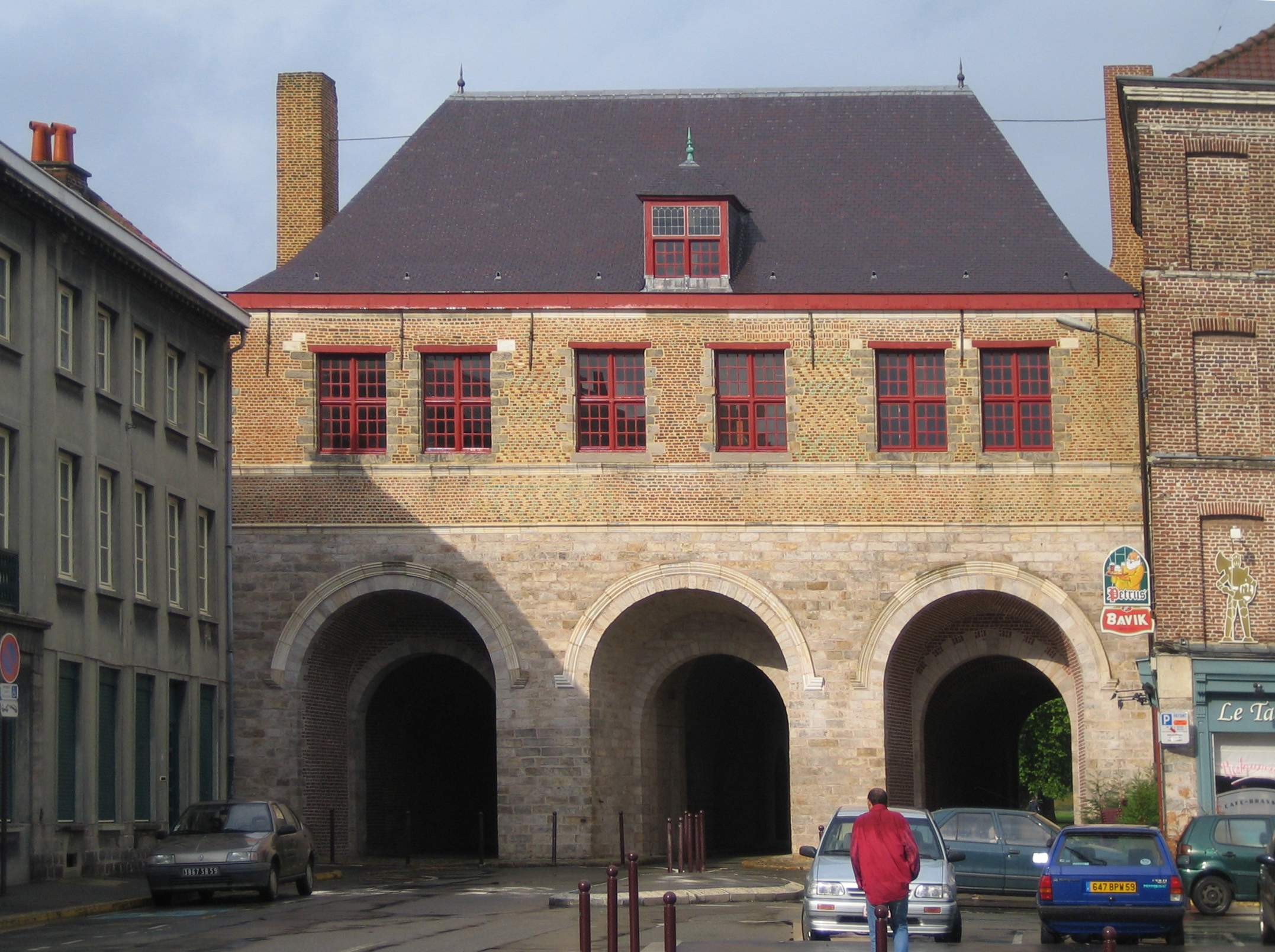
Porte de Roubaix

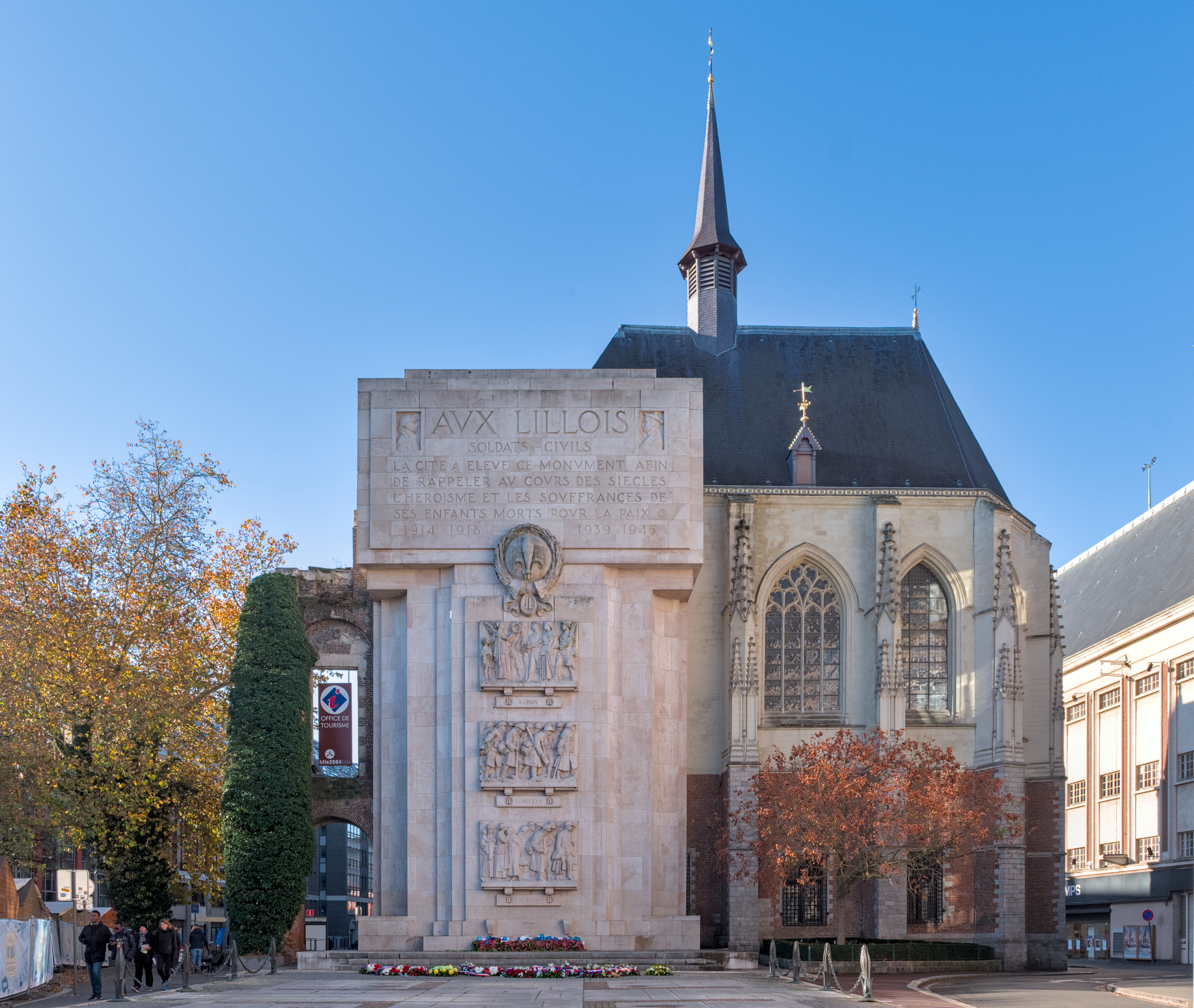
Rihour palace

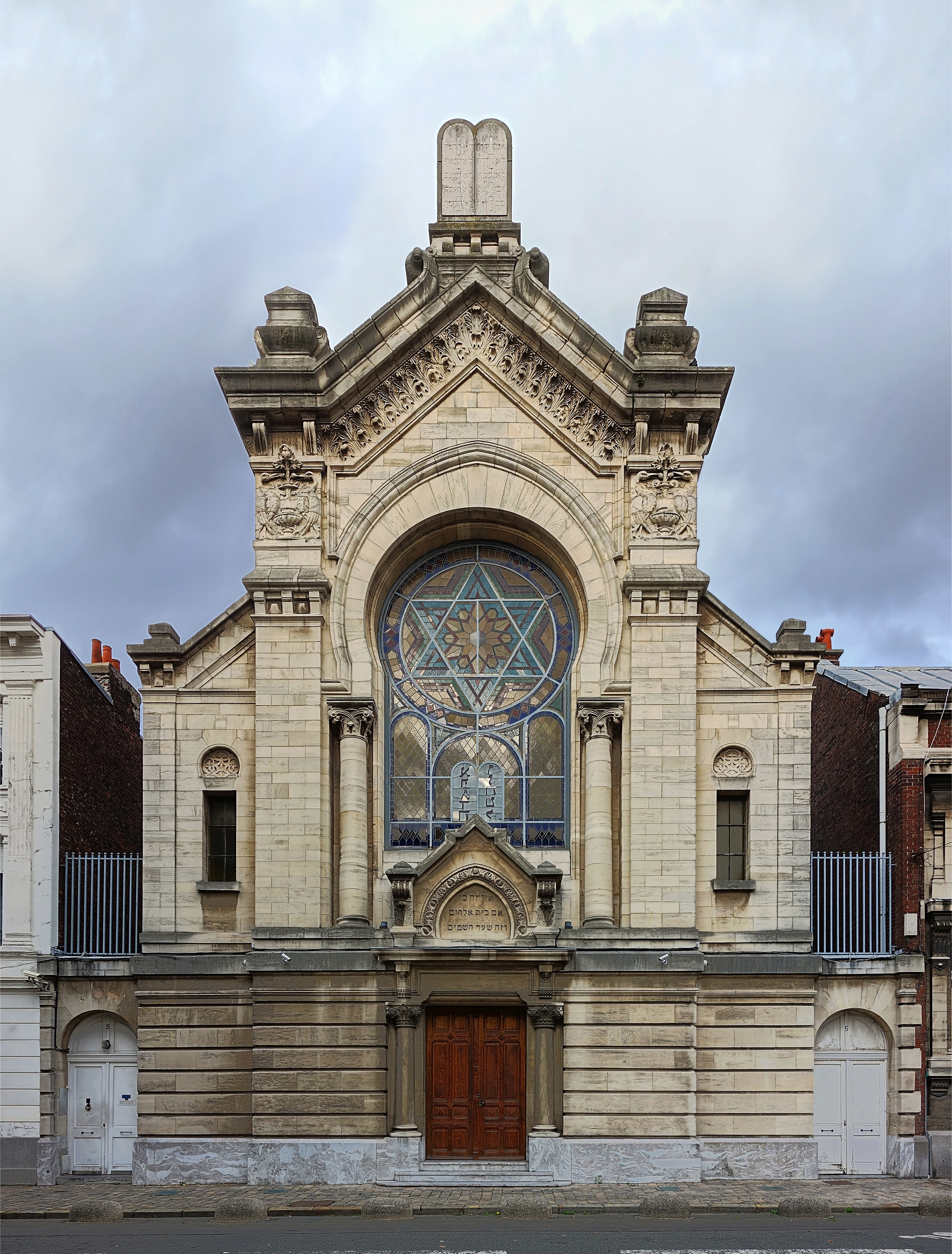
Lille Synagogue, 1891

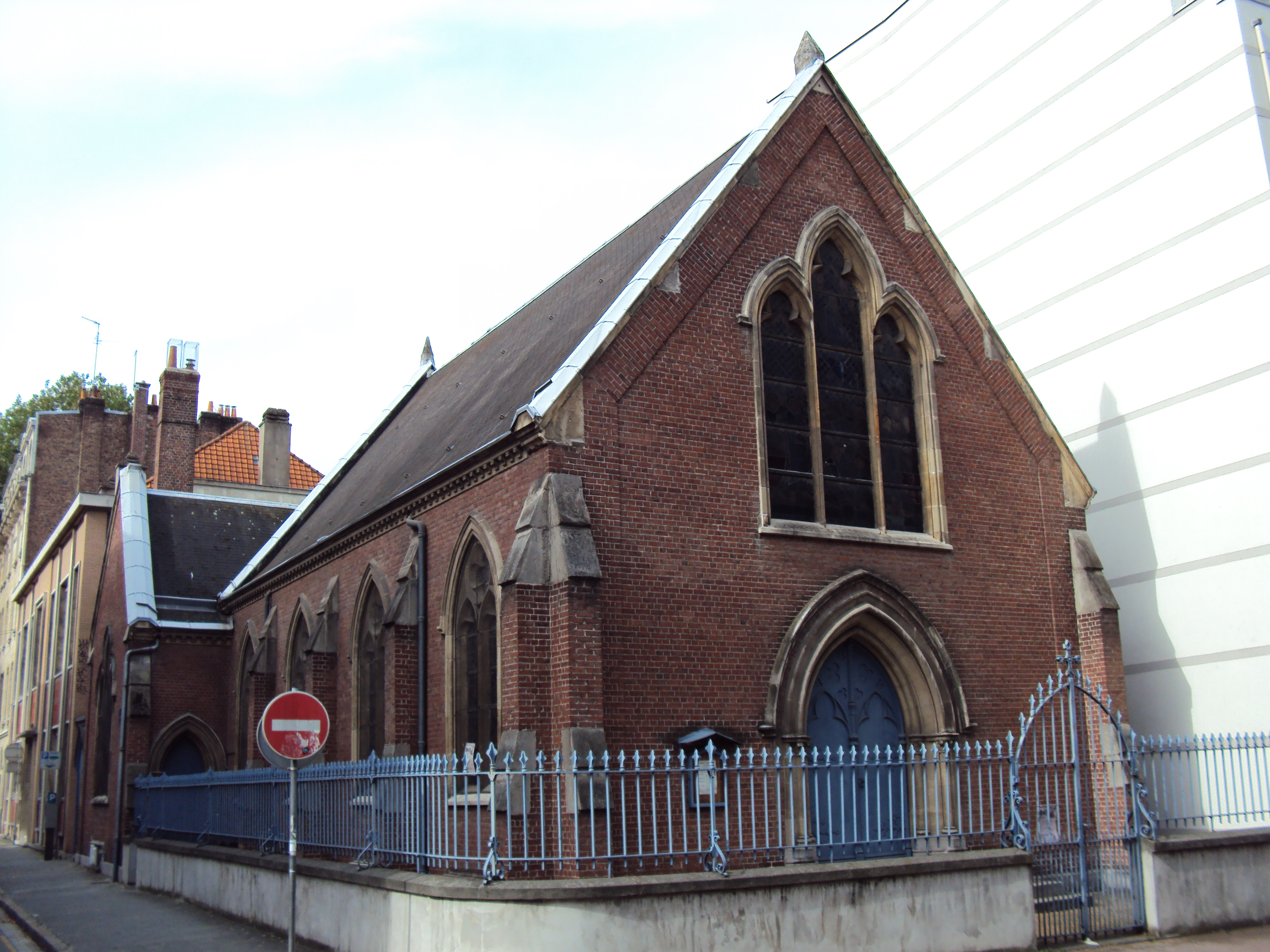
Anglican Christ Church

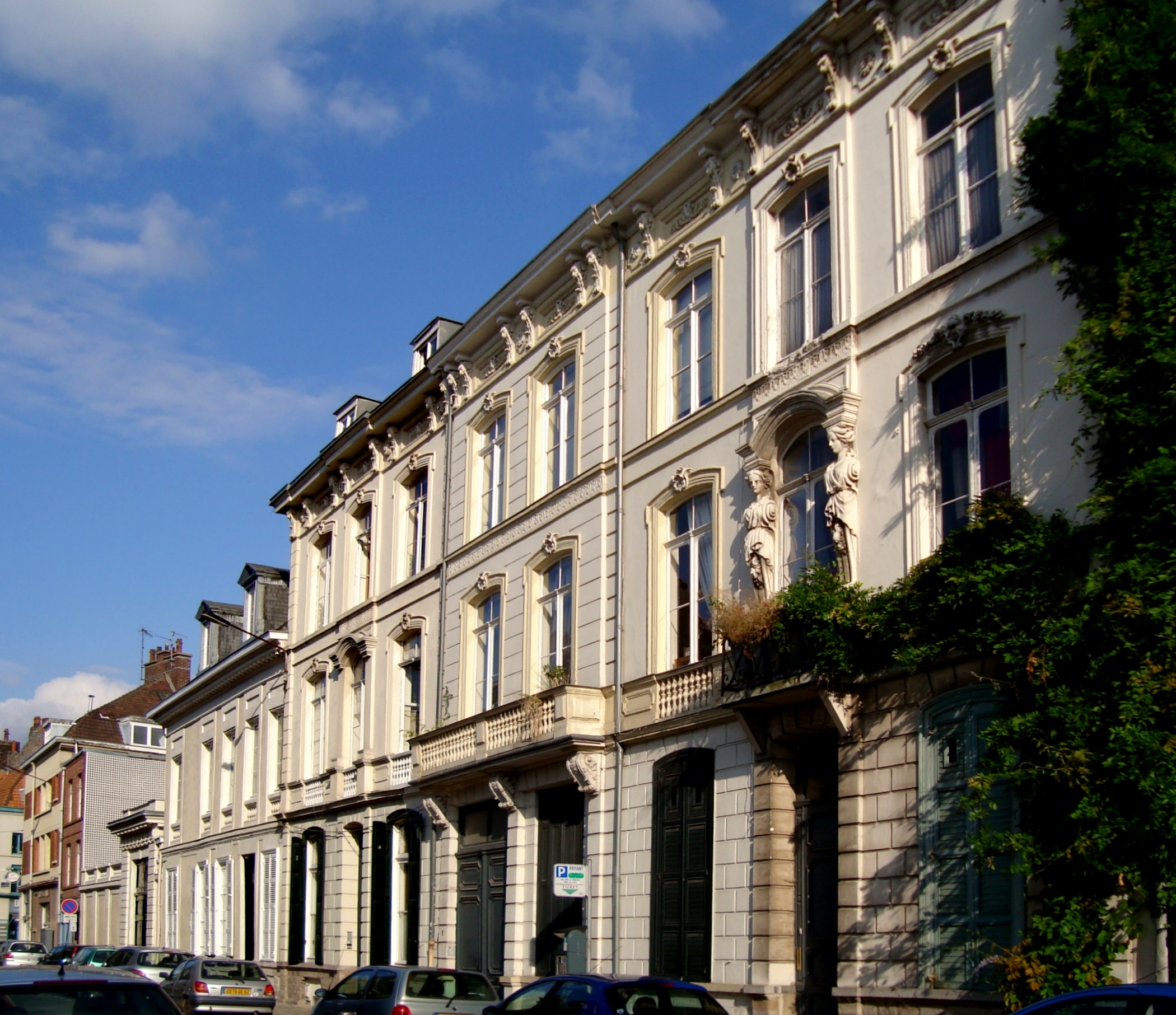
Hôtels particuliers rue Négrier, Vieux-Lille

== Transport ==
=== Public transport ===
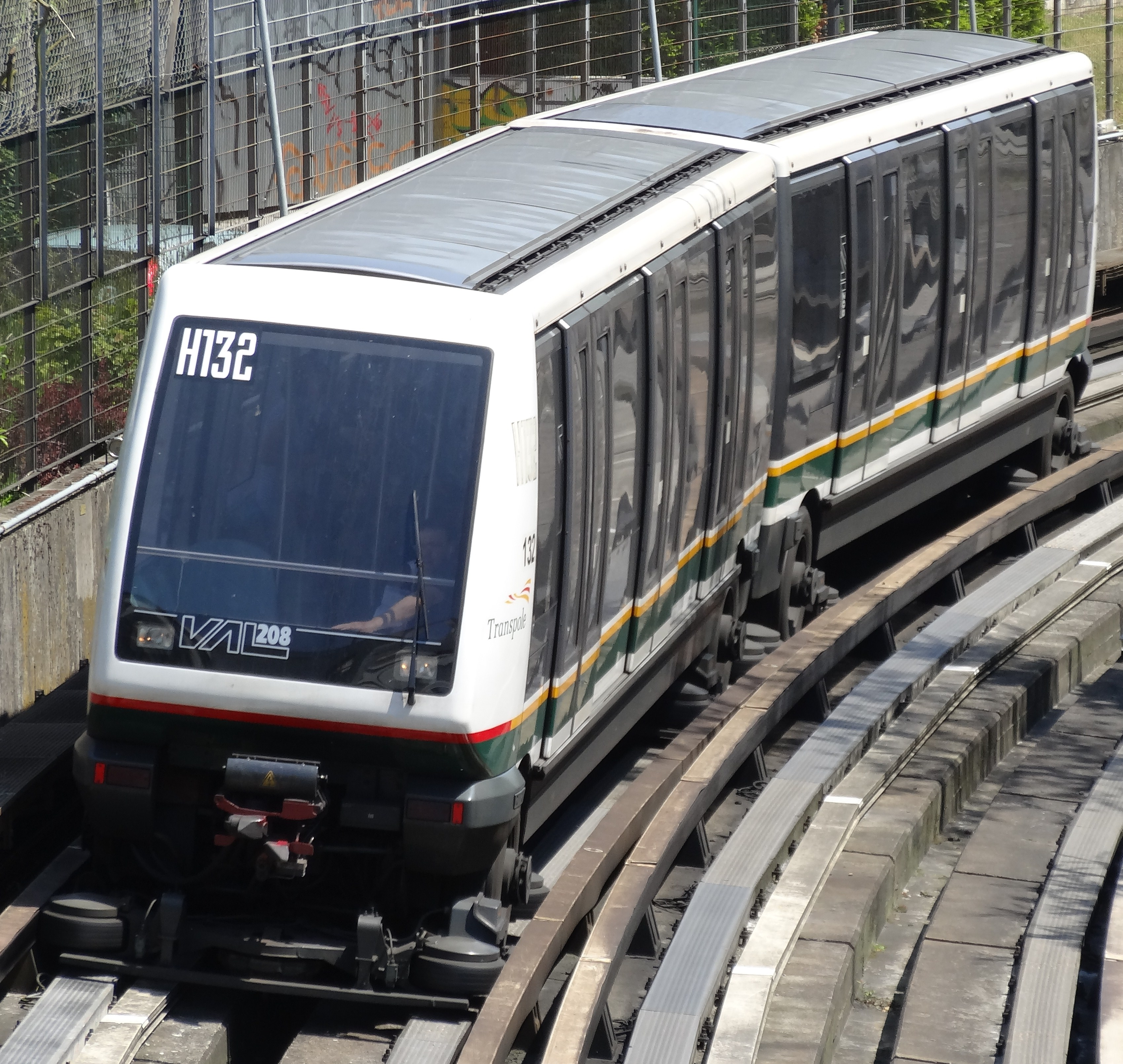
Lille metro

The Métropole Européenne de Lille has a mixed mode public transport system, which is considered one of the most modern in the whole of France. It comprises buses, trams and a driverless light metro system, all of which are operated under the Transpole name. The Lille Metro is a VAL system (véhicule automatique léger = light automated vehicle) that opened on 25 April 1983, becoming the first automatic light metro line in the world.

The system has two lines, with a total length of 45 kilometres (28 miles) and 60 stations. The tram system consists of two interurban tram lines, connecting central Lille to the nearby communities of Roubaix and Tourcoing, and has 45 stops. Sixty-eight urban bus routes cover the metropolis, 8 of which reach into Belgium.

=== Railways ===
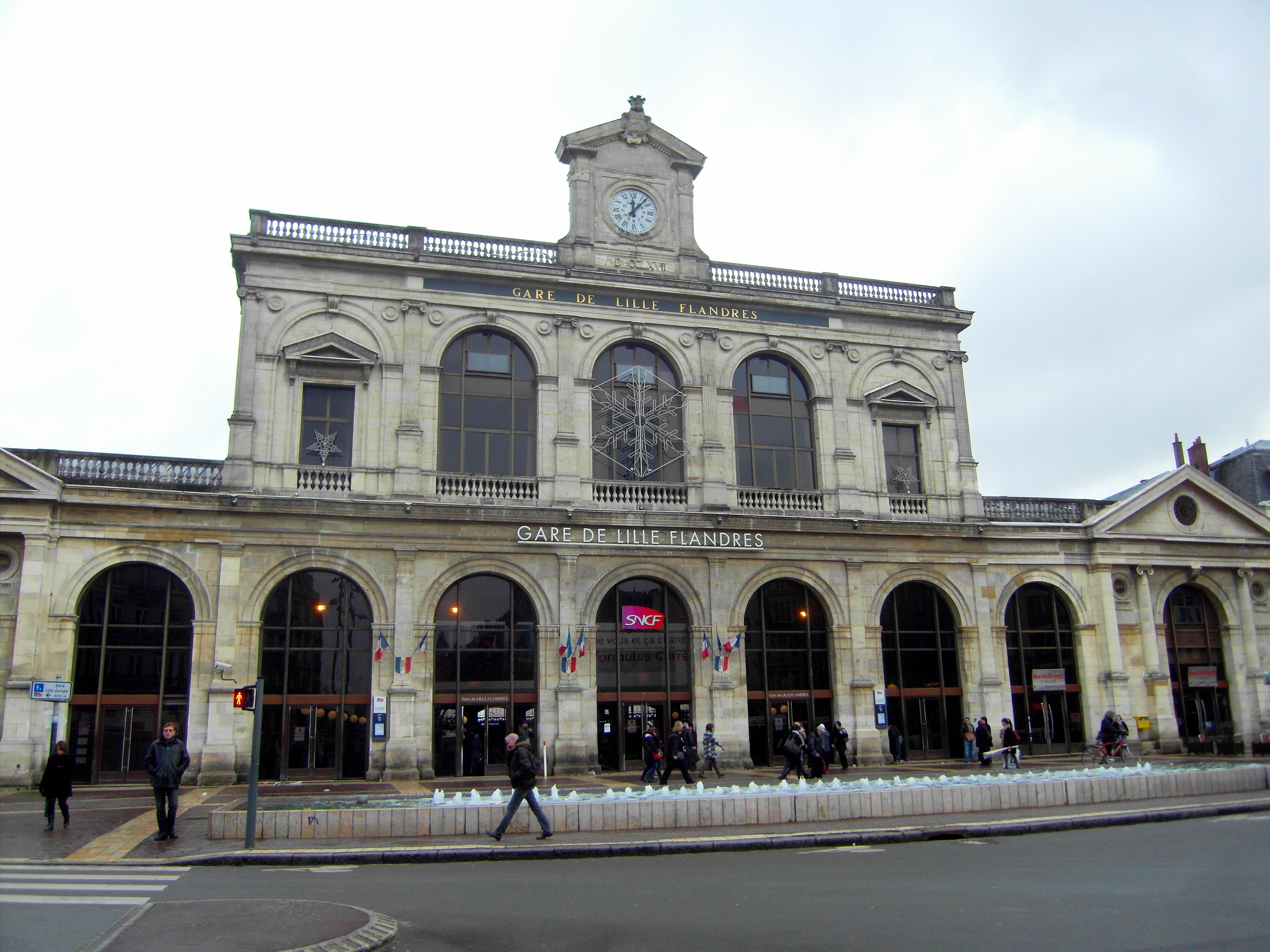
Lille Flandres railway station

Lille is an important junction in the European high-speed rail network. It lies on the Eurostar line to London (80-minute journey). The French TGV network also puts it only 1 hour from Paris and 38 minutes from Brussels and connects it to other major centres in France such as Marseille, Lyon and Toulouse. Lille has two railway stations next to each other: Lille-Europe station (Gare de Lille-Europe), which primarily serves high-speed trains and international services (Eurostar), and Lille-Flandres station (Gare de Lille-Flandres), which primarily serves lower-speed regional trains and regional Belgian trains.

=== Highways ===
Lille: motorway network

Five autoroutes pass by Lille, the densest confluence of highways in France after Paris:

- Autoroute A27: Lille – Tournai – Brussels / Liège – Germany
- Autoroute A23: Lille – Valenciennes
- Autoroute A1: Lille – Arras – Paris / Reims – Lyon / Orléans / Le Havre
- Autoroute A25: Lille – Dunkirk – Calais – England / North Belgium
- Autoroute A22: Lille – Antwerp – Netherlands

A sixth one—the A24—would have linked Amiens to Lille if built, but the project was rejected several times then abandoned.

=== Air traffic ===
Lille Lesquin International Airport is 15 minutes from the city centre by car (11 km). In terms of shipping, it ranks fourth, with almost 38,000 tonnes of freight which pass through each year. Its passenger traffic, around 1.2 million in 2010, is modest due to the proximity to Brussels, Charleroi, and Paris-CDG airports. The airport mostly connects other French and European cities (some with low-cost airlines).

=== Waterways ===
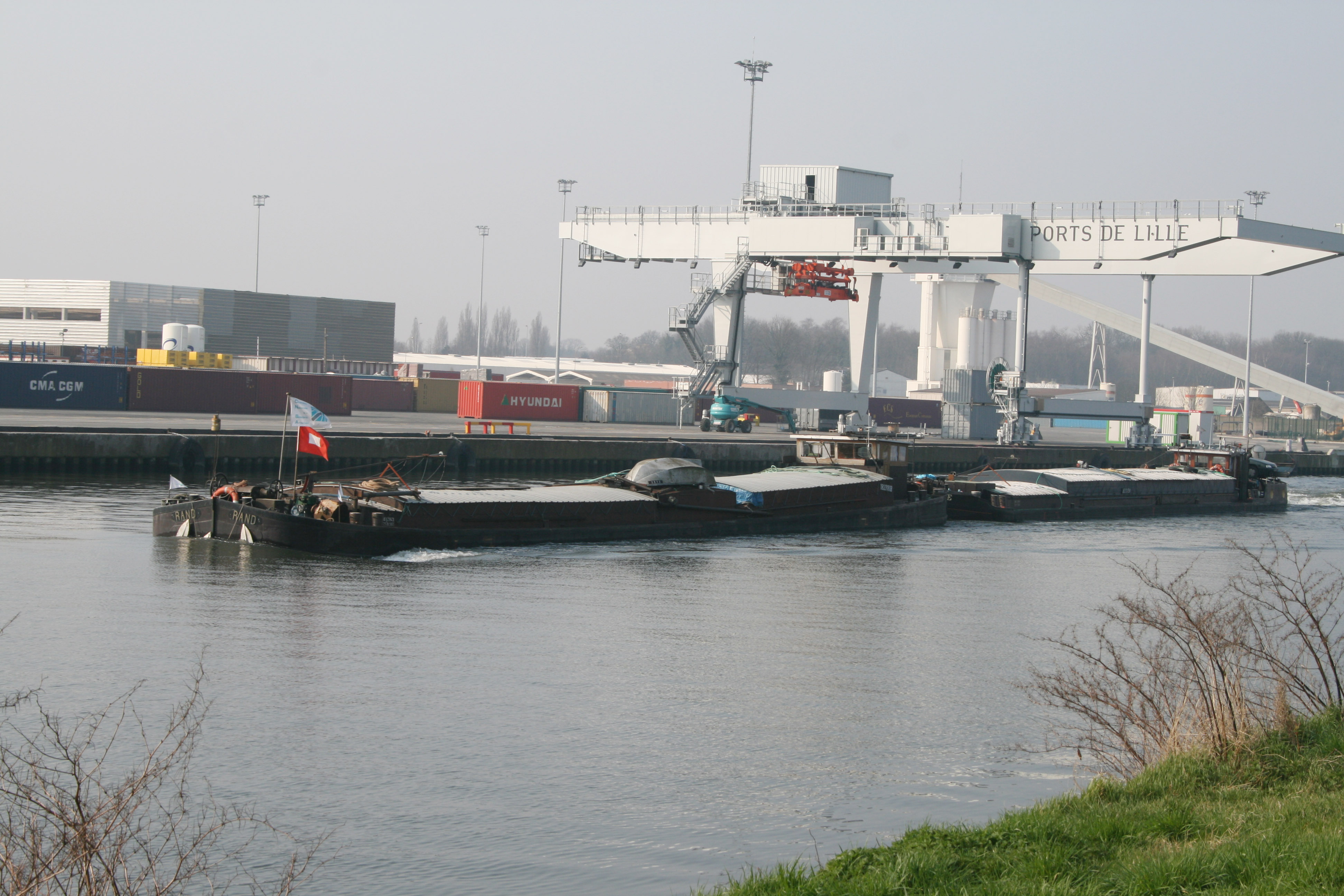
Port de Lille

Lille is the third-largest French river port after Paris and Strasbourg. The river Deûle is connected to regional waterways with over 680 km (423 mi) of navigable waters. The Deûle connects to Northern Europe via the river Scarpe and the river Scheldt (towards Belgium and the Netherlands), and internationally via the Lys (to Dunkerque and Calais).

Shipping statistics

Year	1997	2000	2003
Millions of tonnes	5.56	6.68	7.30
By river or sea	8.00%	8.25%	13.33%
By rail	6.28%	4.13%	2.89%
By road	85.72%	87.62%	83.78%

== Education ==
With a student population of over 110,000 students within its metropolitan area, Lille is one of the major French student cities.

With roots from 1562 to 1793 as University of Douai (then as Université Impériale in 1808), the State University of Lille was established in Lille in 1854 with Louis Pasteur as the first dean of its Faculty of Sciences. A school of medicine and an engineering school were also established in Lille in 1854 and the University of Lille was united as the association of existing public Faculties in 1896. It was then split into three independent university campuses in 1970: Lille 1 University of Science and Technology, Lille 2 University of Law and Health and Lille 3 Charles de Gaulle University of Humanities, Social sciences, Literature and Arts.

In early 2018, the three universities merged to form the new University of Lille (student enrollment: 70,000). The new university is part of the Community of Universities and Institutions (COMUE) Lille Nord de France and the European Doctoral College Lille Nord de France.

Further institutions of higher education established or active in Lille include:

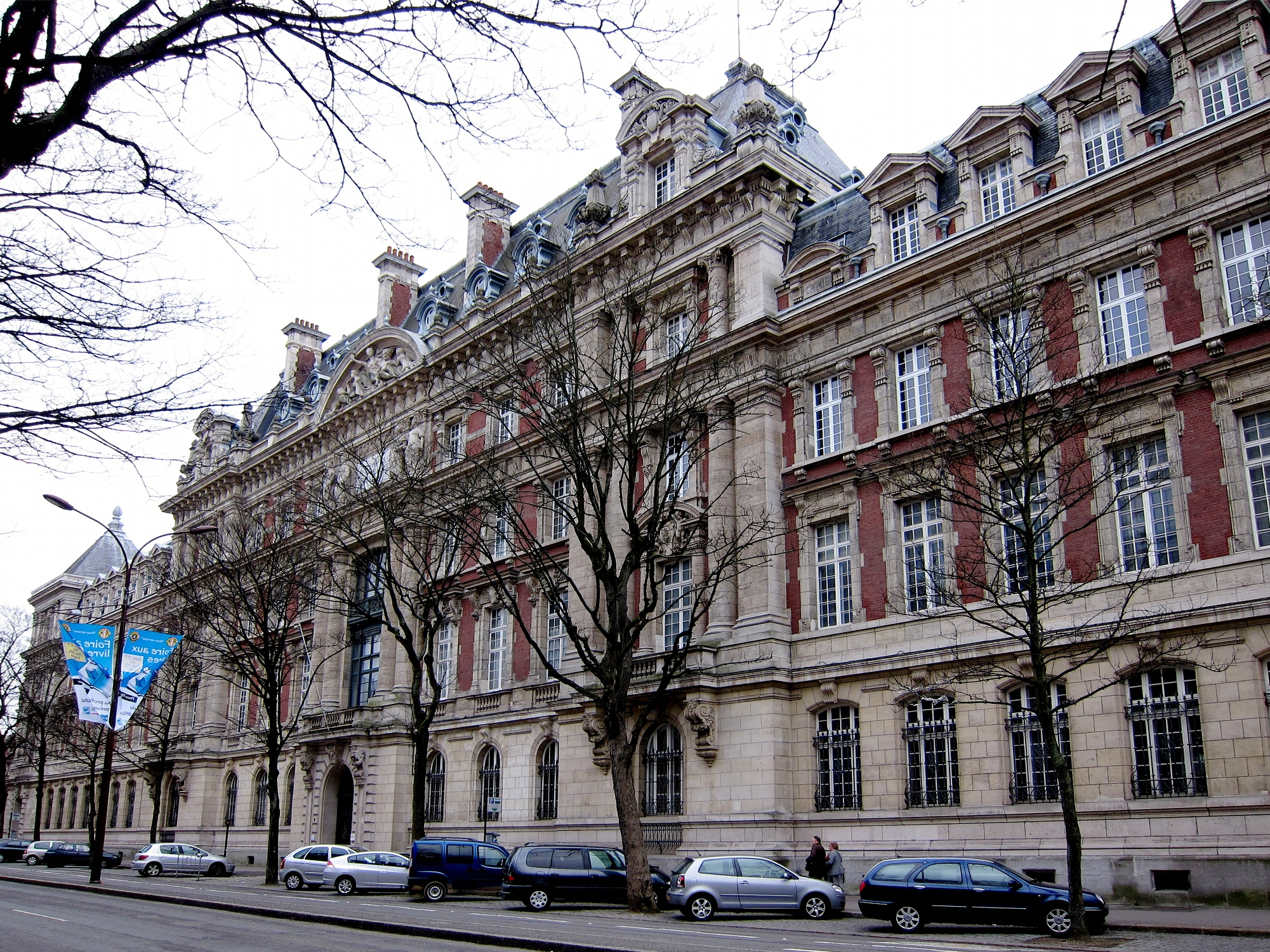
Arts et Métiers ParisTech

- The Arts et Métiers ParisTech, an engineering graduate school of industrial and mechanical engineering, settled in Lille in 1900. This campus is one of the eight Teaching and Research Center (CER) of the school. Its creation was decided by Pierre-Nicolas Legrand de Lérant.
- École centrale de Lille is one of the five Centrale Graduate Schools of engineering in France; it was founded in Lille city in 1854, its graduate engineering education and research center was established as Institut industriel du Nord (IDN) in 1872, in 1968 it moved in a modern campus in Lille suburb.
- École nationale supérieure de chimie de Lille was established as Institut de chimie de Lille in 1894 supporting chemistry research as followers of Kuhlmann's breakthrough works in Lille.
- École supérieure de journalisme de Lille, journalism school created in 1924.
- Skema Business School established in 1892 is ranked among the top business schools in France.
- École pour l'informatique et les nouvelles technologies settled in Lille in 2009.
- ESME-Sudria and E-Artsup settled in Lille in 2012.
- The ESA – École Supérieure des Affaires is a Business Management school established in Lille in 1990.
- IEP Sciences-Po Lille political studies institute was established in Lille in 1992.
- The Institut supérieur européen de formation par l'action is also located in Lille.
- The Institut supérieur européen de gestion group (ISEG Group) established in Lille in 1988.
- The fashion School MOD'SPE Paris has a campus in Lille.
- The European Doctoral College Lille Nord de France is headquartered in Lille Metropolis and includes 3,000 PhD Doctorate students supported by university research laboratories.
- The Université Catholique de Lille was founded in 1875. Today it has law, economics, medicine, physics faculties and schools. Institutions of higher education affiliated with the Catholic University of Lille include:
  - École des hautes études commerciales du nord (EDHEC) founded in 1906. EDHEC's MSc Financial Markets program was ranked #1 worldwide by Financial Times in 2017; making it one of the most prestigious financial study programs globally.
  - École des Hautes études d'ingénieur (HEI) a school of engineering founded in 1885 and offering 10 fields of specialization.
  - Institut catholique d'arts et métiers (ICAM) founded in 1898, ranked 20th among engineering schools, with the specificity of graduating polyvalent engineers.
  - IESEG School of Management founded in 1964 (ranked 17th in the latest Financial Times global ranking of the 90 best masters in management, published on Monday 12 September 2016).

Lille is also site of the University and Polytechnic Federation of Lille (Fédération Universitaire et Polytechnique de Lille), a large private educational university that includes a medical school, business school, law school, etc.

Metropolitan Lille is also home to one of the four accredited European Schools in France, the École Européenne de Lille Métropole Jacques Delors, situated in the Lillois suburb Marcq-en-Baroeul.

== Notable people ==
=== The arts ===
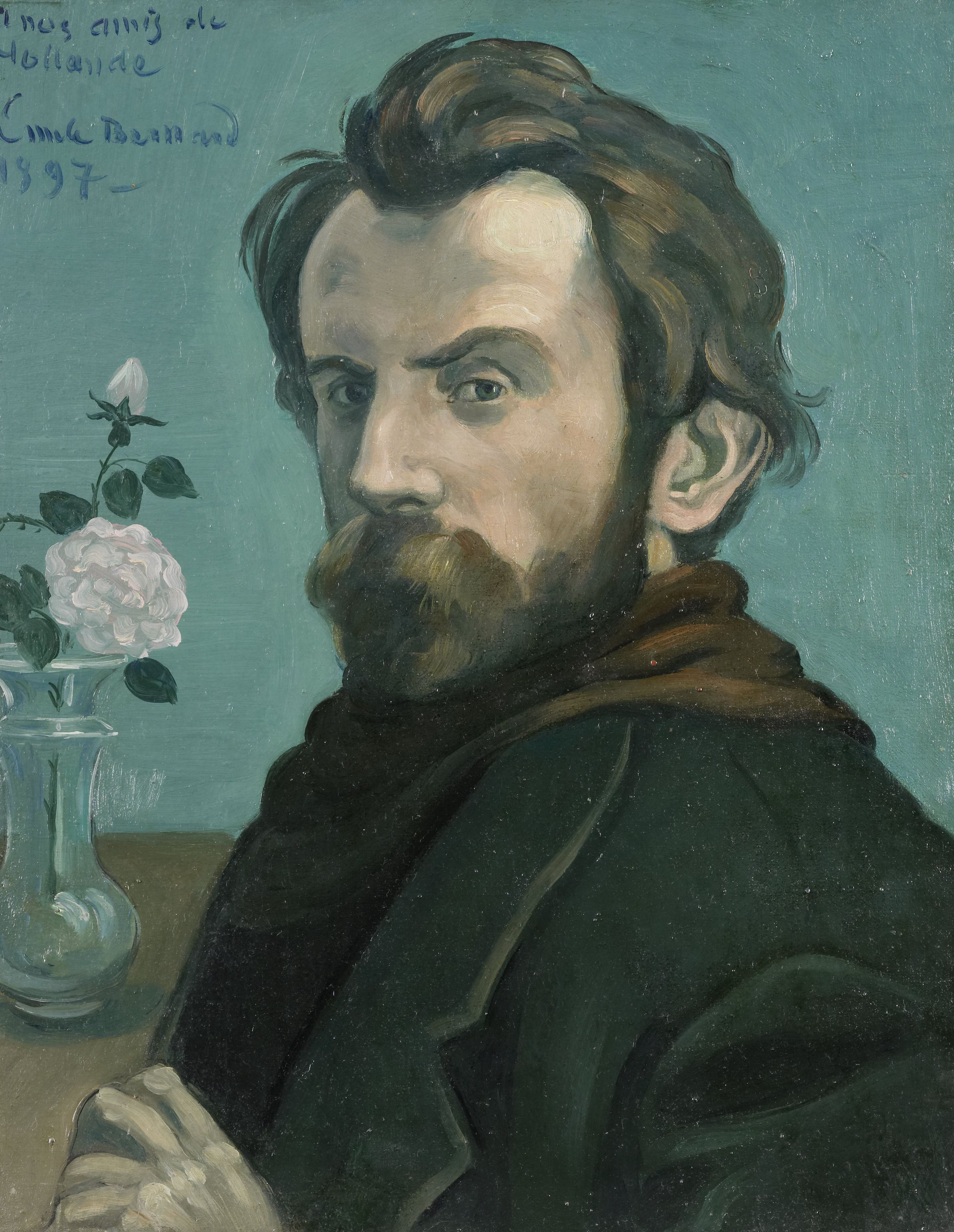
Émile Bernard, 1897

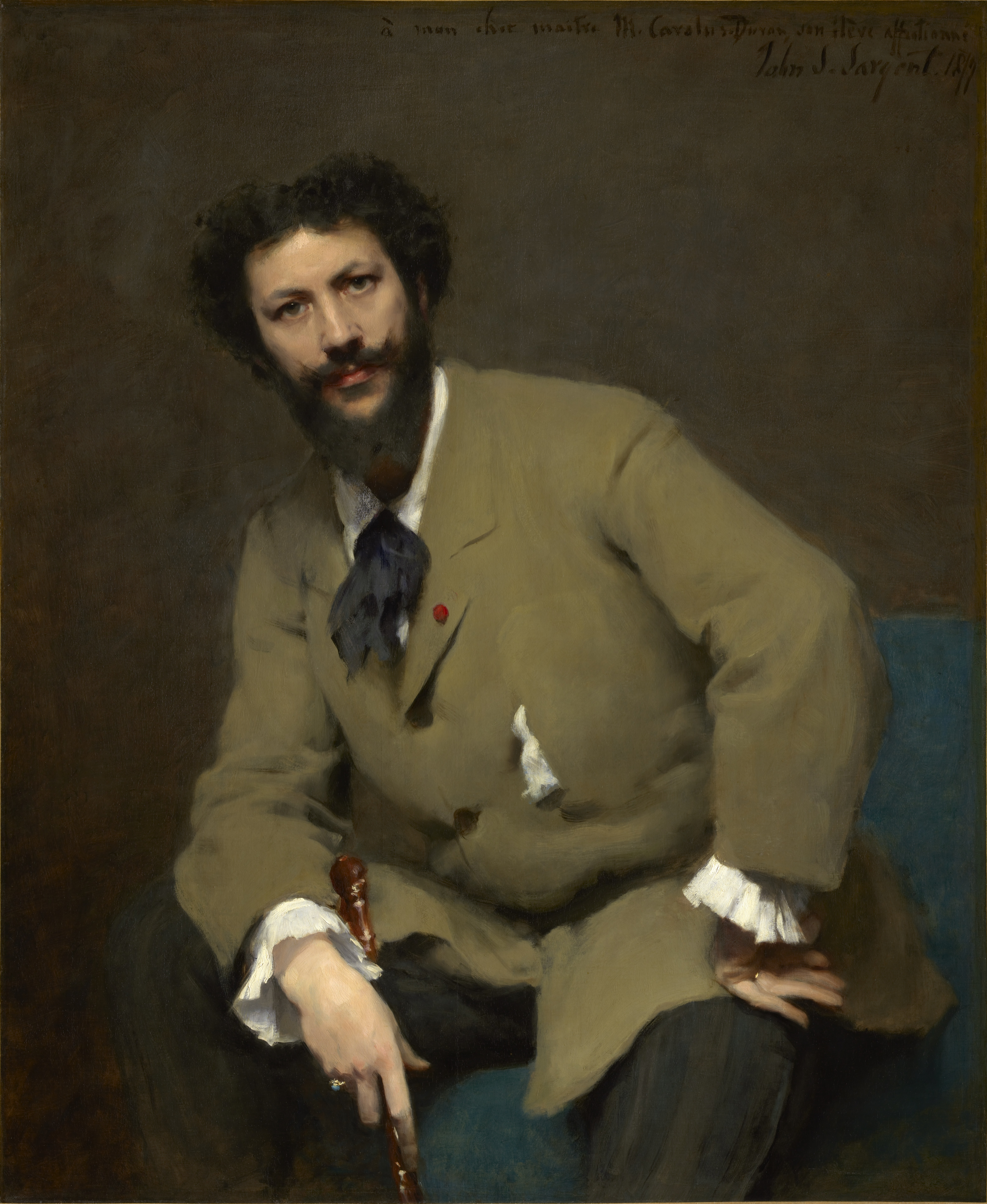
Carolus-Duran, 1879

- Renée Adorée (1898–1933), actress
- Alfred-Pierre Agache (1843–1915), academic painter
- Ernest Joseph Bailly (1753–1823), painter
- Antoinette Bourignon (1616–1680), a French-Flemish mystic and adventurer.
- Victor Chocquet (1821–1891), patron of the arts
- Émile Bernard (1868–1941), neoimpressionist painter
- Yvonne Chauffin (1905–1995), writer, winner of the 1970 edition of the Prix Breizh
- Édouard Chimot (d. 1959), artist and [illustrator, editor of the Devambez illustrated art-editions
- Léon Danchin (1887–1938), animal artist and sculptor
- Alain Decaux (1925–2016), TV presenter, minister, writer, member of the Académie française
- Pierre De Geyter (1848–1932), textile worker, composed the music of The Internationale in Lille
- Philippe de Rougemont (1891–1965), painter
- Désiré Dihau (1833–1909), bassoonist and composer
- Raoul de Godewaersvelde (1928–1977), singer
- Gabriel Grovlez (1879–1944), pianist, conductor and composer
- Pierre Dubreuil (1872–1944), photographer
- Carolus-Duran (1837–1917), painter.
- Julien Duvivier (1896–1967), director
- Yvonne Furneaux (1928–), actress
- Paul Gachet (1828–1909), doctor known for treating the painter Vincent van Gogh
- Jacquemart Giélée (13th century), poet
- Constance Jablonski (born 1991), model
- Kamini (1980–), rap singer, hits success in 2006 with the "rural-rap" Marly-Gomont
- Édouard Lalo (1823–1892), composer.
- Armand Lemay (1873–1963), architect
- Adélaïde Leroux (born 1982), actress
- Serge Lutens (born 1942), photographer, make-up artist and fashion designer
- Phil. Macquet (born 1967), painter
- Iris Mittenaere (born 1993), model, Miss France 2016, and Miss Universe 2016
- Philippe Noiret (1930–2006), actor
- Charles-Joseph Panckoucke, (1736–1788), intellectual and writer
- Pascal Renwick (1954-2006), French voice actor
- Albert Samain (1858–1900), poet.
- Ana Tijoux (born 1977), rapper and singer whose family originally was from Chile

=== Politics, military and public service ===
- Martine Aubry (1950–), deputy, minister, and Mayor of Lille until March 2025
- Madeleine Damerment (1917–1944), French Resistance fighter, Legion of Honor, Croix de Guerre, Médaille de la Résistance
- Pierre Joseph Duhem (1758–1807), physician and Montagnard
- Louis Faidherbe (1818–1889), general, founder of the city of Dakar and senator
- Charles de Gaulle (1890–1970), general, resistance fighter, President of France
- Joseph Gratry (1805−1872) theologian and author.
- Isabella of Hainault (1170–1190), Queen of France as the first wife of King Philip II.
- Augustin Laurent (1896–1990), minister, deputy, resistance fighter, and Mayor of Lille
- Achille Liénart (1884–1973), « cardinal des ouvriers »
- Alain de Lille (c. 1128 – c. 1202), a theologian and poet.
- Yves de Lille (c. 1587–unknown), Flemish Capuchin friar and author
- Pierre Mauroy (1928–2013), deputy, senator, Prime Minister of France, and Mayor of Lille

=== Science and mathematics ===
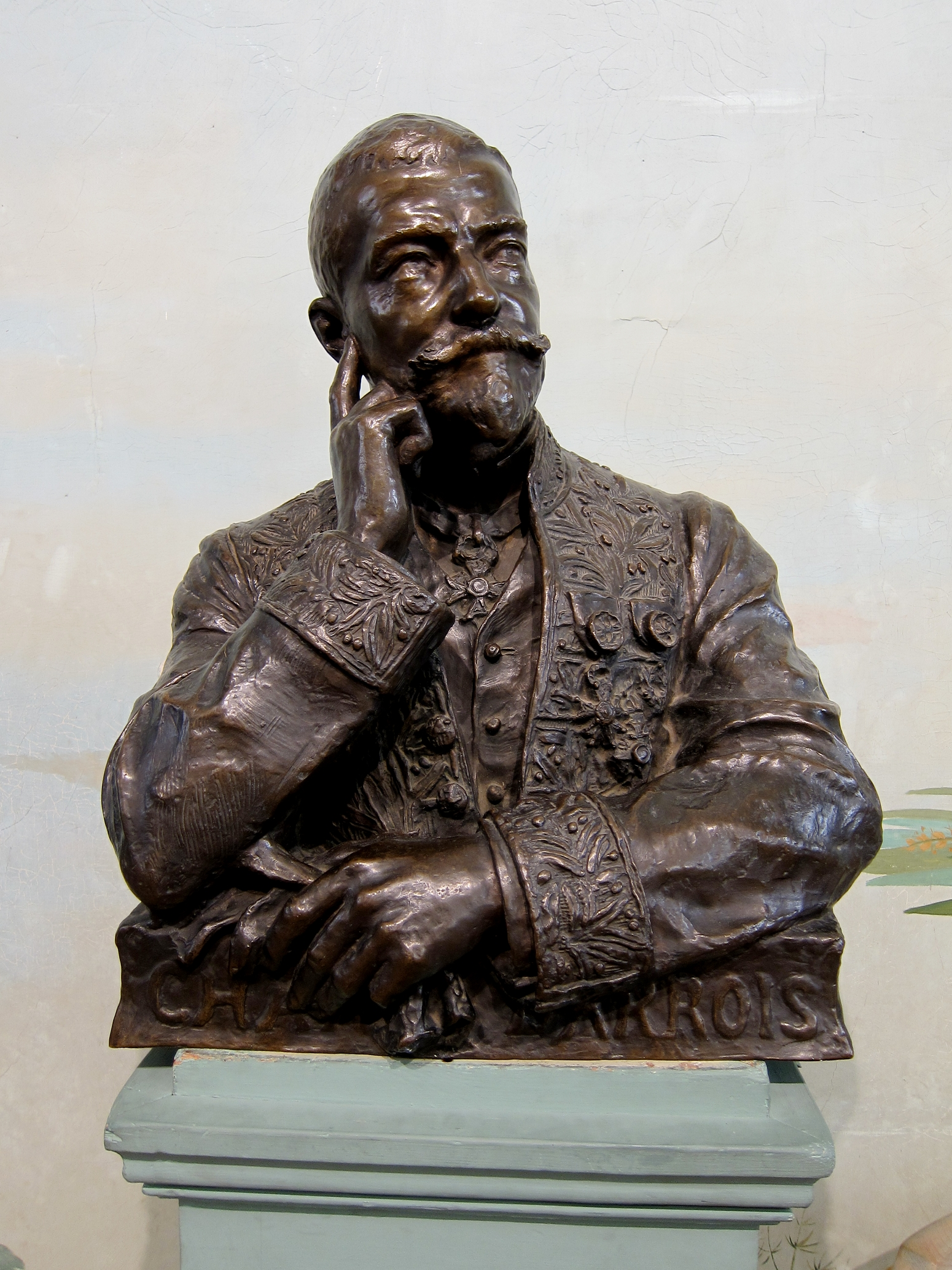
Bust of Charles Barrois in the Lille Natural History Museum

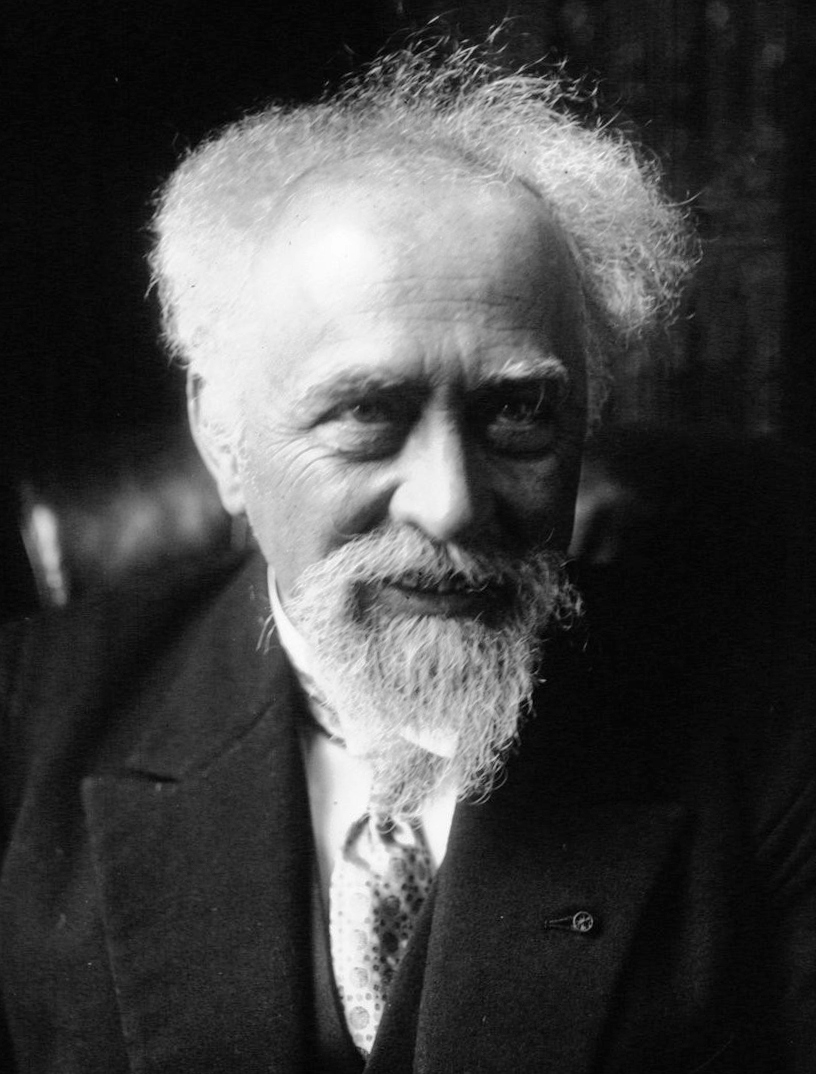
Jean Perrin, 1926

- Charles Barrois (1851–1939), geologist and palaeontologist.
- Joseph Valentin Boussinesq (1842–1929), mathematician and physicist
- Albert Calmette (1863–1933) and Camille Guérin (1872–1961), scientists who discovered the antituberculosis vaccine
- Yvonne Choquet-Bruhat (1923–2025), mathematician and physicist
- Jean Dieudonné (1906–1992), mathematician
- Paul Hallez (1846–1938), biologist
- Joseph Kampé de Fériet (1893–1982), researcher on fluid dynamics
- Charles Frédéric Kuhlmann (1803–1881), chemist professor
- Gaspard Thémistocle Lestiboudois (1797–1876), naturalist
- Matthias de l'Obel (1538–1616), physician to King James I of England, scientist
- Henri Padé (1863–1953), mathematician
- Paul Painlevé (1863–1933), mathematician and politician
- Louis Pasteur (1822–1895), micro-biologist
- Jean Baptiste Perrin (1870–1942), Nobel Prize in physics
- Henri Béghin (1876-1969), mathematics professor

=== Sport ===
- Maxime Agueh (born 1978), footballer
- Sanaa Altama (born 1990), footballer
- Alain Baclet (born 1986), footballer
- Nabil Bentaleb (born 1994), footballer
- Ismael Ehui (born 1986), footballer
- Patrick Francheterre (born 1948), ice hockey player, coach and manager
- Amandine Henry (born 1989), footballer
- Gaël Kakuta, footballer
- Sylvie Levecq, athlete
- Arthur Masuaku (born 1993), footballer
- Clarck N'Sikulu, footballer
- Sarah Ousfar (born 1993), basketball player
- Alassane Pléa, footballer
- Lucas Pouille, tennis player
- Alain Raguel (born 1976), footballer
- Antoine Sibierski (born 1974), footballer
- Didier Six (born 1954), footballer
- Philippe Suywens (born 1971), footballer
- Jerry Vandam, footballer
- Raphaël Varane (born 1993), footballer
- Abdellah Zoubir (born 1991), footballer

== Media ==
Local newspapers include Nord éclair and La Voix du Nord.

France's national public television network has a channel that focuses on the local area: France 3 Nord-Pas-de-Calais.

== Sports ==
The city's most successful association football club, Lille OSC, currently plays in Ligue 1, the highest level of football in France. The club has won eight major national trophies and regularly features in the UEFA Champions League and UEFA Europa League. In the 2010–11 season, Lille won the league and cup double. In 2020–21, they won the league and supercup.

Lille's Stade Pierre-Mauroy was the playground for the final stages of the FIBA EuroBasket 2015. The same venue hosted handball and basketball events at the 2024 Summer Olympics. It was in Lille that the 100th World Esperanto Congress took place, in 2015.

Lille is home to Lille Lacrosse, former national champion and continuously one of France's best lacrosse teams. The team plays its home games at Halle de glisse.

== Twin towns and sister cities ==
Lille is twinned with:

- Buffalo, United States
- Cologne, Germany
- Edmonton, Canada
- Erfurt, Germany
- Esch-sur-Alzette, Luxembourg
- Haifa, Israel
- Huế, Vietnam
- Kharkiv, Ukraine
- Leeds, England, United Kingdom
- Liège, Belgium
- Nablus, Palestine
- Oujda, Morocco
- Rotterdam, Netherlands
- Saint-Louis, Senegal
- Tlemcen, Algeria
- Turin, Italy
- Valladolid, Spain
- Wrocław, Poland

== See also ==
- Rue Esquermoise
- Place du Général-de-Gaulle (Lille)
- Vieux-Lille
- Lille 3000
- Compagnie des Canonniers de Lille

== Sources ==
- Codaccioni, Félix-Paul (1976). De l'inégalité sociale dans une grande ville industrielle, le drame de Lille de 1850 à 1914. Lille: Éditions Universitaires, Université de Lille 3. ISBN 2-85939-041-3.
- Collectif (1999). Lille, d'un millénaire à l'autre (Fayard ed.). Fayard. ISBN 2-213-60456-8.
- Despature, Perrine (2001). Le Patrimoine des Communes du Nord (Flohic ed.). Flohic. ISBN 2-84234-119-8.
- Duhamel, Jean-Marie (2004). Lille, Traces d'histoire. Les patrimoines. La Voix du Nord. ISBN 2-84393-079-0.
- Gérard, Alain (1991). Les grandes heures de Lille. Perrin. ISBN 2-262-00743-8.
- Legillon, Paulette; Dion, Jacqueline (1975). Lille : portrait d'une cité. Axial.
- Lottin, Alain (2003). Lille – D'Isla à Lille-Métropole. Histoire des villes du Nord. La Voix du Nord. ISBN 2-84393-072-3.
- Maitrot, Eric; Cary, Sylvie (2007). Lille secret et insolite. Les Beaux Jours. ISBN 978-2-35179-011-3.
- Marchand, Philippe (2003). Histoire de Lille. Jean-Paul Gisserot. ISBN 2-87747-645-6.
- Monnet, Catherine (2004). Lille : portrait d'une ville. Jacques Marseille. ISBN 2-914967-02-0.
- Paris, Didier; Mons, Dominique (2009). Lille Métropole, Laboratoire du renouveau urbain. Parenthèses. ISBN 978-2-86364-223-8.
- Pierrard, Pierre (1979). Lille, dix siècles d'histoire. Stock. ISBN 2-234-01135-3.
- Trenard, Louis (1981). Histoire de Lille de Charles Quint à la conquête française (1500–1715). Toulouse: Privat. ISBN 978-2708923812.
- Versmée, Gwenaelle (2009). Lille méconnu. Jonglez. ISBN 978-2-915807-56-1.
