= Maison Folie Moulins =

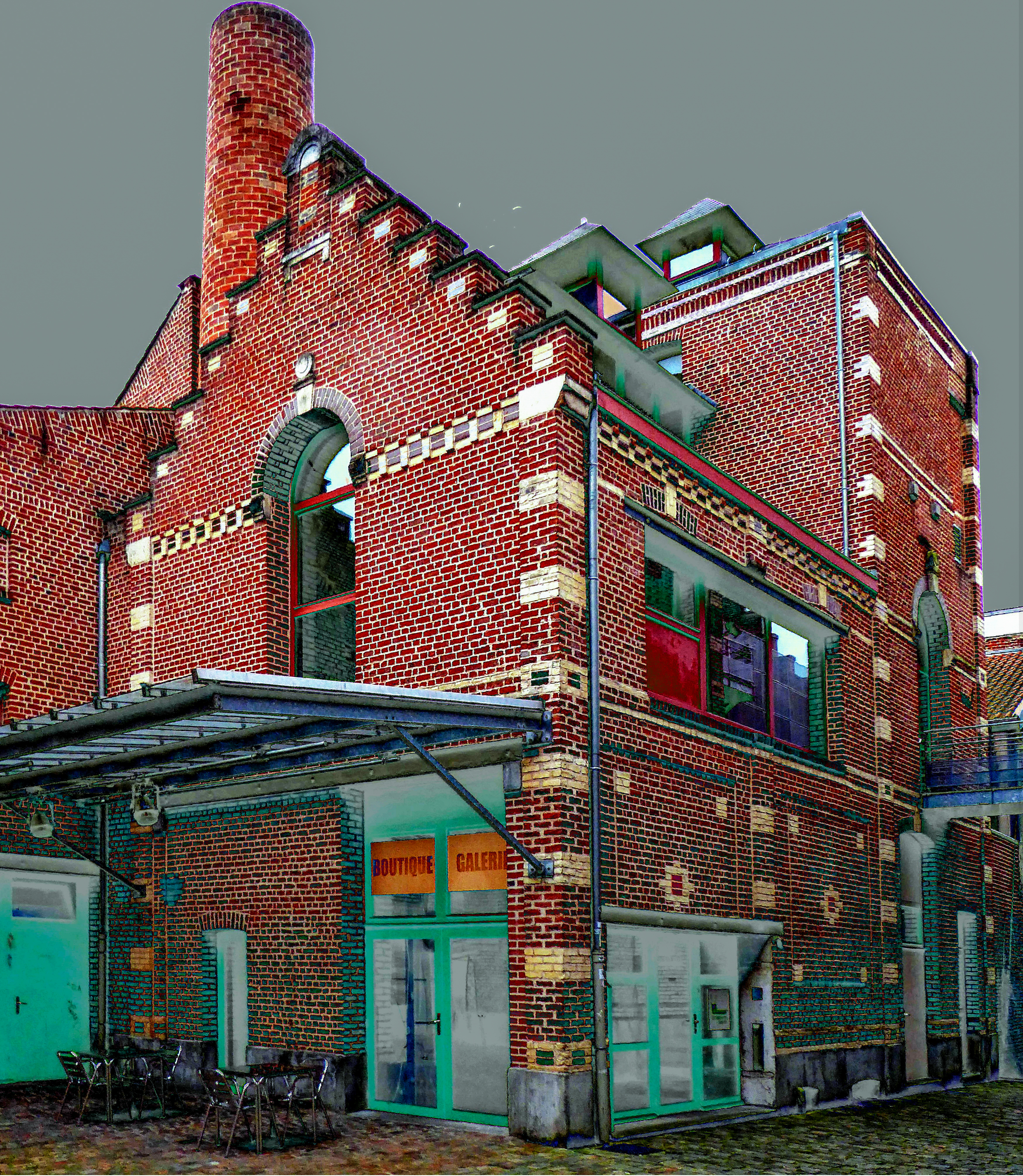
- Maison Folie Moulins
- Interactive map of Maison Folie Moulins
- Former names: Maison Folie Moulins
- Address: rue d’Arras
- Location: Lille, France
- Coordinates: 50.622960°N 3.068057°E
- Owner: City of Lille

Construction
- Opened: 2004

Website
- Venue Website (in French)

The Maison Folie Moulins is a public building built for the event Lille 2004, European capital of culture. It is located rue d'Arras in Lille- Moulins, a popular district of Lille.

== Description ==
The Maison Folie is housed in a former brewery of 18th-century, the Corman Vandame brewery, named after its owner from 1881 or the Trois Moulins brewery, closed in 1934. Rehabilitated by the architects Thierry Baron and Philippe Louguet, it reopened its doors in March 2004 to host concerts, shows, exhibitions, screenings, creative residencies and even meetings.

The Folie Moulins house has a total surface area of 4,900 ft (1,500 m), divided into several rooms, two outdoor courtyards and two apartments dedicated to artistic creation residences. In 2014, the last building of the brewery, not rehabilitated in 2004, should offer new workspaces at Maison Folie. The buildings of the former Corman Vandame brewery are listed under "Monument historique' in France

Having become a municipal establishment after 2004, the Maison Folie Moulins has since developed an artistic project at the crossroads of disciplines. Thanks to the multiplicity of its spaces and the ambience of its interior courtyard, it creates a mix of proposals, artists and audiences, often in conjunction with many partners from the Lille Eurometropolis.

== Bibliography ==
- Page de la maison Folie Moulins sur le site web de Lille

== See also ==
- Official site.
