= Philippe de Rougemont =

French painter

- Born: 20 May 1891; Lille, France
- Died: 1965
- Occupation: Painter

Philippe de Rougemont (1891–1965) was a French painter known for his portraiture and figurative work. Born in France, he spent much of his artistic career in Stockholm, Sweden, where he became known for painting society figures and dignitaries.

== Life ==
Philippe de Rougemont was born in 1891 in Lille, France, the son of Pastor Alfred de Rougemont and Baroness Franziska von Stain zu Lausnitz. He moved to Paris to study at the Académie Delecluse, where he met Sigrid Wahlström-de Rougemont, who would become his wife. They married in 1917, and they had their daughter Béatrice in 1918. By 1919 they had relocated to Stockholm. In 1922 they had a son, Erik.

De Rougemont established himself primarily as a portrait painter, creating depictions of individuals from Swedish high society, such as Gustav V and Prince Charles.
