= Yves de Lille =

Jean Verdière, in religion Yves de Lille (active 1609-1628), was a Flemish Capuchin friar who wrote an account of a pilgrimage to Holy Land undertaken in 1624–1625.

== Life ==
Jean was born in Lille around 1587 to Charles Verdière and Christiane Muette. He entered the Capuchin novitiate in Douai on 28 October 1609, taking the name Yves in religion. In 1624 he was one of three Capuchin friars sent to Jerusalem to offer prayers for the intentions of Isabella Clara Eugenia, governess-general of the Habsburg Netherlands. His companions on the journey were Clément d'Aire and Léonard de Tournai, the latter of whom had already made a pilgrimage to the Holy Land on Isabella's behalf in 1602–3.

On 3 August 1624 they received pontifical permission to make the journey, during which they would spend six weeks as the captives of pirates. They visited several shrines in Italy along the way, and set sail for Cairo on 16 April 1625, travelling by way of Sinai to Jerusalem. They made the return journey from Sidon to Malta, then Sicily, Italy, and France to arrive back in Amiens.

Yves went on to become Guardian of the Capuchin house in Armentières in 1627–1628.

== Works ==
Yves's account of his travels to and from the Holy Land was partially published in Paris in 1626. The full manuscript was edited by Félix-Marie Abel of the École Biblique in Études Franciscaines, volumes 44-45 (1932–1933).
