= Esquermes =

Coordinates: 50°37′30″N 3°02′21″E

Esquermes (French pronunciation: [ekɛʁm]) is a former commune in the Nord department in northern France. Since 1858 it is part of Lille.

== Heraldry ==
Arms of Esquermes	The arms of Esquermes are blazoned : Gules, the name Esquermes bendwise between two bendlets Or, and to sinister on an inescutcheon Or, a lion sable.

== See also ==
- Communes of the Nord department
