= Place du Général-de-Gaulle (Lille) =

Plaza in Hauts-de-France, France

Place du Général-de-Gaulle Forum, Place du Marché, Place d'Armes, Grand'Place (Note: Until the 21st century. From then on, historians consider the forum to be the commune's middle-class district.)
- Town square and Grote Markt
- Général-de-Gaulle Plaza
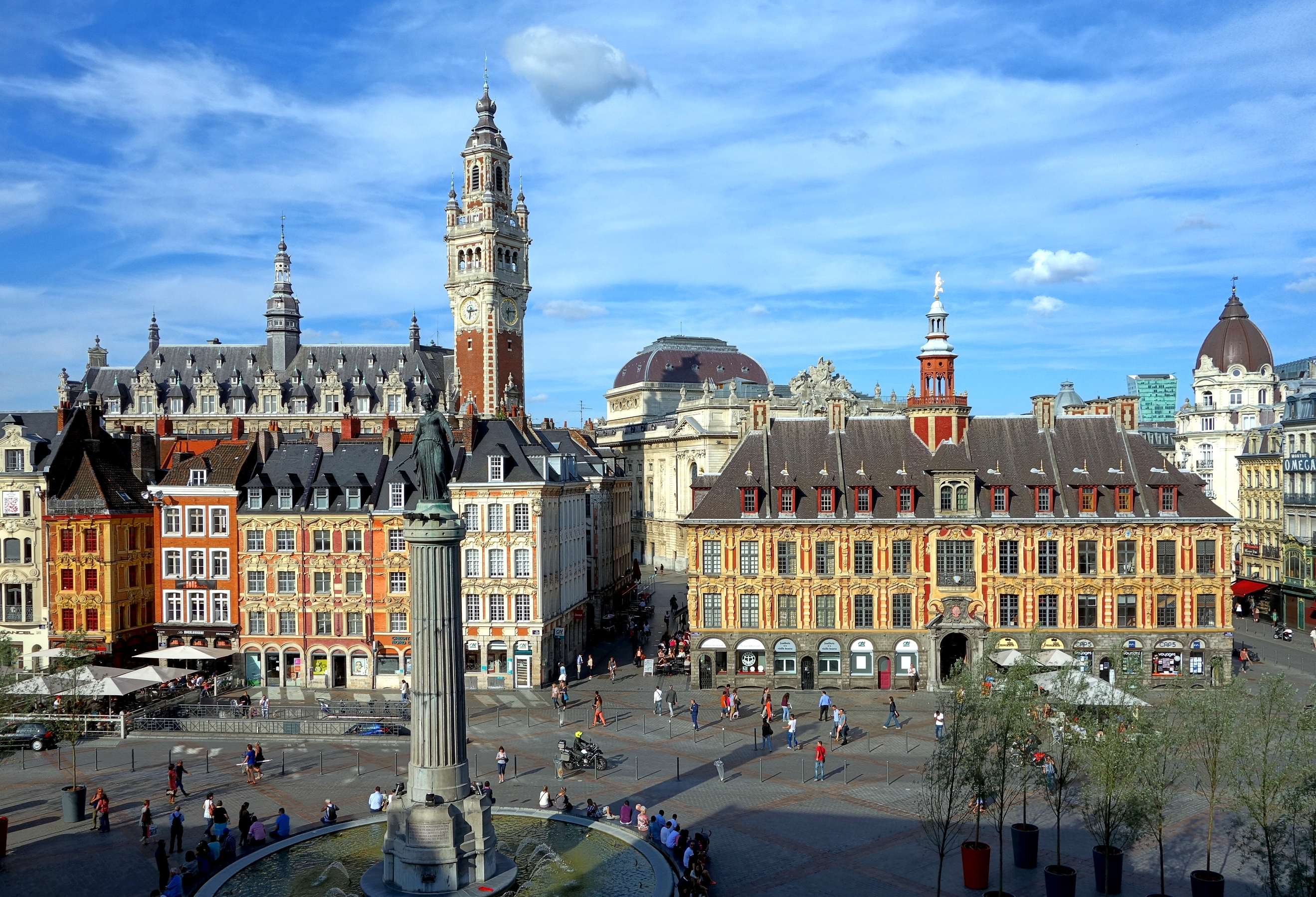
- In the foreground, the Column of the Goddess. In the background, the Old Stock Exchange (right)

- Flag Coat of arms

- Location within France
- Coordinates: 50°38′13″N 03°03′48″E
- Country: France
- Region: Hauts-de-France
- City: Lille
- District: Lille-Centre
- Creation: Late 13th century
- Named for: Charles de Gaulle

Dimensions
  - Length: 0.155 km (0.096 mi)
  - Width: 0.072 km (0.045 mi)

The Place du Général-de-Gaulle (French pronunciation: [plas dy ʒeneʁal də ɡol]) is an urban public space situated in the commune of Lille, Hauts-de-France region. It is the town's historic main square. It has a grand-place style, which is typical of many cities in the former Netherlands.

Until the 21st century, the square was considered to be part of the Forum mentioned in the 1066 foundation act of the Collegiate Church of Saint-Pierre. It is believed to have originated in the 14th century when the town's aldermen decided to turn it into a market. The Deûle was canalized, the ground gradually raised by embankments, then paved to create a market square. In the 17th century, the construction of the Vieille Bourse divided the square into the Grand-Place and the Petite-Place (now the Place du Théâtre). After the liberation of Lille during World War II, the square was renamed in honor of Charles de Gaulle. The square is known locally as the Grand'Place or, more rarely, the Place de la Déesse.

The Place du Général-de-Gaulle continues to serve as a grand plaza for festivities, exchanges, and commercial activities, as well as various events of all kinds. It's still the heart of Lille's braderie. The book trade, with the Furet du Nord bookshop and numerous secondhand booksellers, is also important.

The square is surrounded by a number of buildings, eight of which are listed as historical monuments, including the Théâtre du Nord (formerly the Grande Garde) and the Vieille Bourse (formerly the Bourse de Commerce). At the center of the square stands the Column of the Goddess. Built in 1845, it represents the heroism of the people of Lille during the siege of 1792.

== Location and access ==
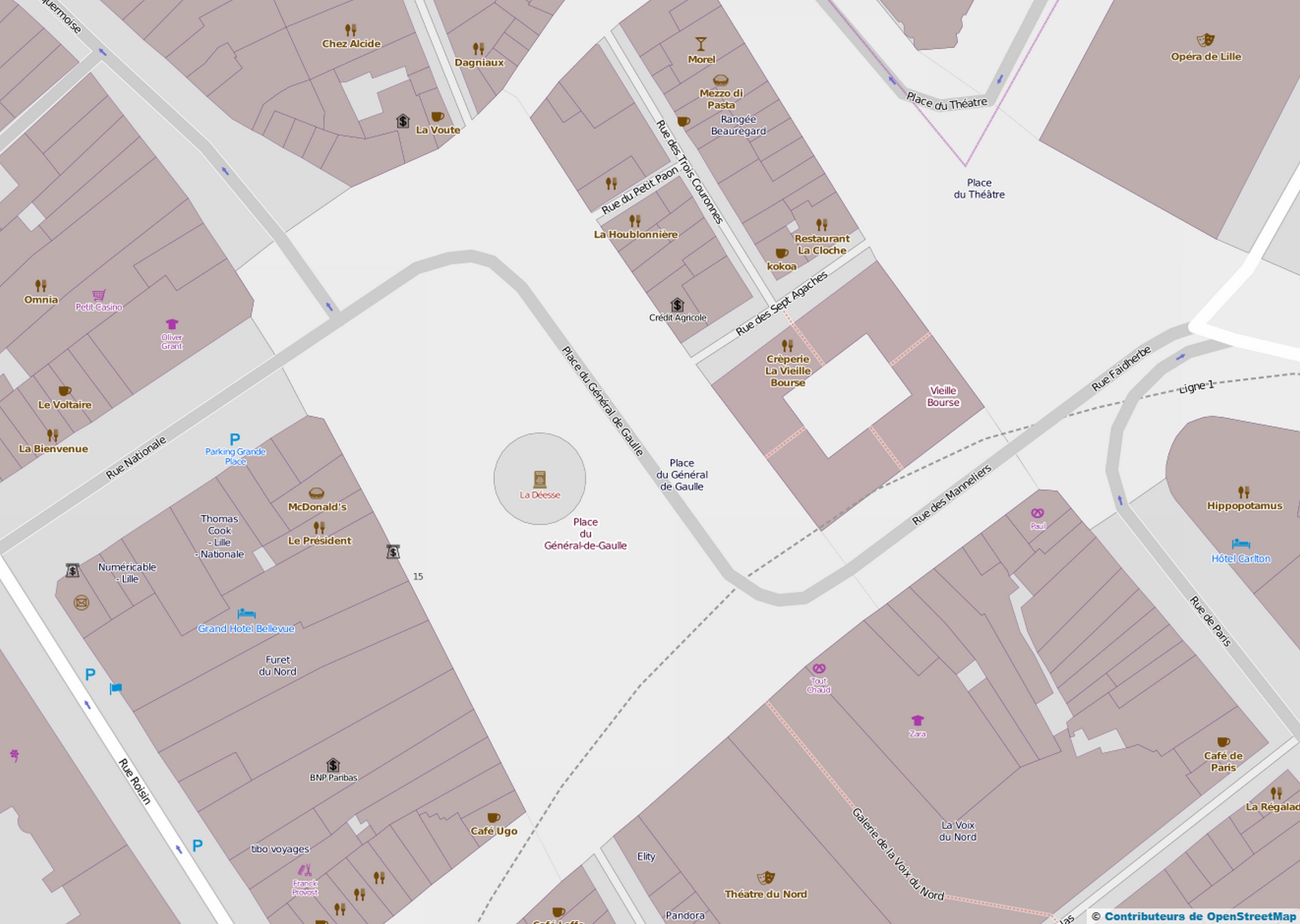
Place du Général-de-Gaulle, between the Place du Théâtre, the Place Rihour and the Nouveau Siècle

The Place du Général-de-Gaulle is located at the heart of Lille, between the pedestrian zone and Vieux-Lille. In an almost rectangular shape, it is 155 meters long and 72 meters wide. Three of its sides form right angles with each other, while the last is convex with the Rue Esquermoise. The Place du Général-de-Gaulle is paved in checkerboard made out of Lanhélin blue granite and Clarté pink granite.

For motorized vehicles, since August 1, 2016, the Place du Général-de-Gaulle is accessible exclusively from the Rue des Manneliers. The passage for cars is now a one-way street. Vehicles can exit via the Rue Esquermoise to the north-west and via the Rue Nationale to the south-west. For pedestrians, the main square is also accessible via these streets, but also via the Rue Neuve and the Place Rihour to the south, via the Rue des Sept-Agaches, the Rue du Petit-Paon, and the Rue de la Bourse to the east, as well as via the Rue des Débris-Saint-Étienne to the north. Since 2011, the Place du Général-de-Gaulle has been a "zone de rencontre": motorized vehicles must give way to pedestrians, and their speed is limited to 20 km/h.

The square is accessible by metro, via the first line from Rihour station. It is also accessible from Lille-Flandres station, 400 meters away via the Rue Faidherbe. The underground parking lot beneath the Grand-Place has 342 spaces. According to a survey carried out in 2007 on a population sample of 100, 48% of people arriving at the Place du Général-de-Gaulle came on foot, 32% by public transport, 14% by car, and 6% by bicycle. In 2007, the same study counted 9,000 pedestrians and between 400 and 500 vehicles per day in each direction during rush hour, of which 10-15% used the underground parking lot. With the arrival of the metro, buses have been discontinue, as previously, the square served as a nodal point where several tramway lines converged. Since June 2012, the Vieux-Lille shuttle, a minibus serving Vieux-Lille, crosses the Place du Général-de-Gaulle.

== Name origins ==
In September 1944, after the liberation of Lille, the square was renamed in honor of Charles de Gaulle, who was born in the commune in 1890, and became known as the "Place du Général-de-Gaulle".

From the middle of the 14th century onwards, the square was known as the "Place du Marché", then "Grand'Place" and even "Grande-Place" since the erection of the Bourse du Commerce in 1652, names that are still attributed to the square. In the past, the square was known as the "Place d'Armes". The square is also commonly known as the "Place de la Déesse".

Based on the foundation act of the Collegiate Church of Saint-Pierre, historians have long believed that the square dates back to the origins of the commune. It was identified with the Forum, cited in 1066, but archaeological digs have shown that this was not the case. Rather, the notion of a forum refers to the fact that the district was inhabited by the most affluent and bourgeois families, extending over the present-day Rue de la Grande-Chaussée, Rue des Chats-Bossus, Rue de la Clef, and Rue des Arts. It is therefore impossible to identify the Grand-Place with the forum of the 12th century.

The Grand-Place is registered as "LR10" among Lille's "îlots regroupés pour l'information statistique" (IRIS), as established by Insee in 1999.

== History ==
=== Middle Ages: the creation of the marketplace ===
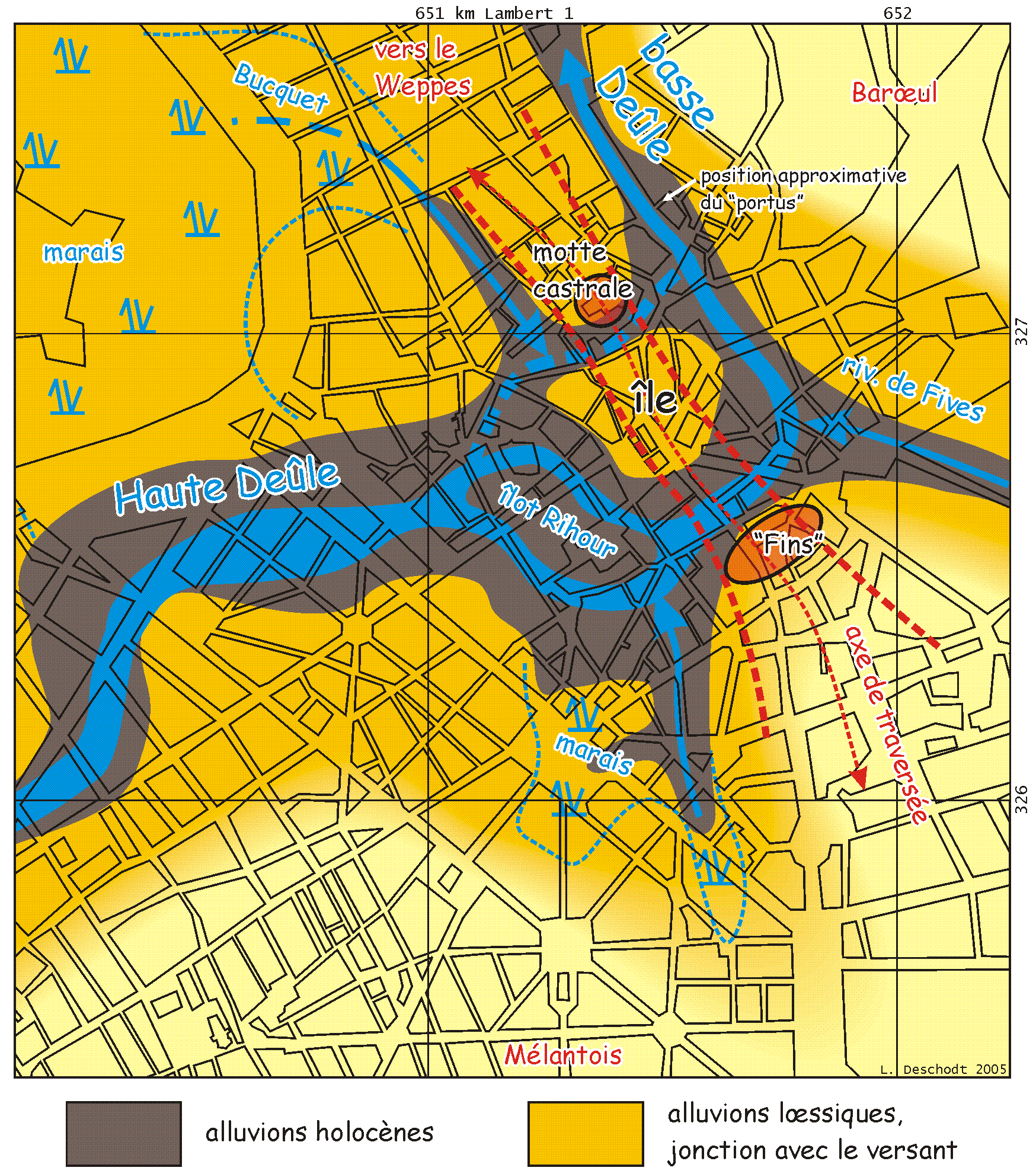
Superimposition of a map of Lille today and a supposed map of Lille in the Middle Ages: the Grand-Place is in the alluvial zone of the Deûle.

Up until the 13th century, the site was occupied by the waters of the Deûle and by a marsh. Nearby was the alderman's hall, which burned down in 1213 and was rebuilt in 1233. In 1242, the city's aldermen canalized the Basse-Deûle between La Bassée and Lille, creating a permanent body of water and flooding the cellars bordering the present-day square. In 1271, the canalization of the Upper Deûle was completed. This released the space corresponding to today's Grand Place. Initially, the site was crossed from time to time, with difficulty, and only in fine weather, by horse-drawn carriages or horsemen, whose horses had lost many of their shoes, reflecting the difficulty of making headway in the muddy terrain.

The cleared space was soon used for commercial activities at the Lille market. Dating from the end of the 13th century, the first improvements consisted in leveling the ground, which was covered with yellow silt, then with mortar. Grain trading took place under a wattle-and-daub building, which was burnt down and never rebuilt. There were also cattle pens.

At the beginning of the 14th century, chalk was laid down, followed regularly by thick embankments to raise the ground, which was still flooded during the highest floods. Merchants who came to sell their wares paid a tax at the entrance to the town, in exchange for which they received tax méreaux certifying that they were in good standing. In the 14th century, a layer of evenly packed limestone was laid down, definitively establishing the site's purpose as a market square. (it took this name around 1350), hosting the numerous stalls of merchants sheltered under canvas awnings, which they set up as they pleased, without the alderman being able to enforce compliance with the defined locations.

From the middle of the 14th century, the municipality hired staff to clean the market. Access to the market was via three non-aligned streets. In addition to today's Place du Général-de-Gaulle, the trapezoidal market extended into today's Place du Théâtre and the buildings between them, covering an area of at least eight hectares. At the northern corner of the square stood the church of Saint-Étienne, with its cemetery. To the east, the square was flanked by private houses, commonly known at the time as the "Pottery Market"; to the south, by the alderman's hall, houses, and a butcher's shop; and to the west, by houses backing onto the Canal des Boucheries, one of Lille's many covered canals in the 19th century, which ran approximately where the Rue Saint-Nicolas is today. At its center, from north to south, were the Hôtel du Beauregard, the Chapelle des Ardents, and the Fountaine au Change.

The square was also a symbolic place for the authorities: the revart, the town's chief Alderman, and the prévôt de la ville, the king's agent, were based there. The square was also the site of the pillory, where those condemned to death were tortured and their bodies displayed. The Place du Marché was also a place for festivities. In front of the alderman's hall, the Épinette festival was held, featuring an equestrian joust on the first Sunday of Lent. Dice were also played here, despite prohibitions.

At the beginning of the 15th century, the square was paved with an irregular layer of green sand, and by the middle of the century, both the growing population of Lille and the need to embellish the square prompted the Chambre des Comptes to lease public land adjoining the cemetery to residents. The operation enabled the town to re-establish its finances. Much of the trade in foodstuffs and handicrafts took place on or near the square: there was always the wheat market, but also markets for chickens, fish, salt, compenage (all the foodstuffs used to accompany bread), sayette cloth, straw, horses, pottery and shuttles. Near the market square were the public infrastructures needed for the market: the money changers and the public weight, as well as other specialized markets: the Ruelle aux Fromages and the Rue des Manneliers (basketmakers). Shoemakers were located nearby.

=== Modern times: from the Place du Marché to the Grand-Place ===
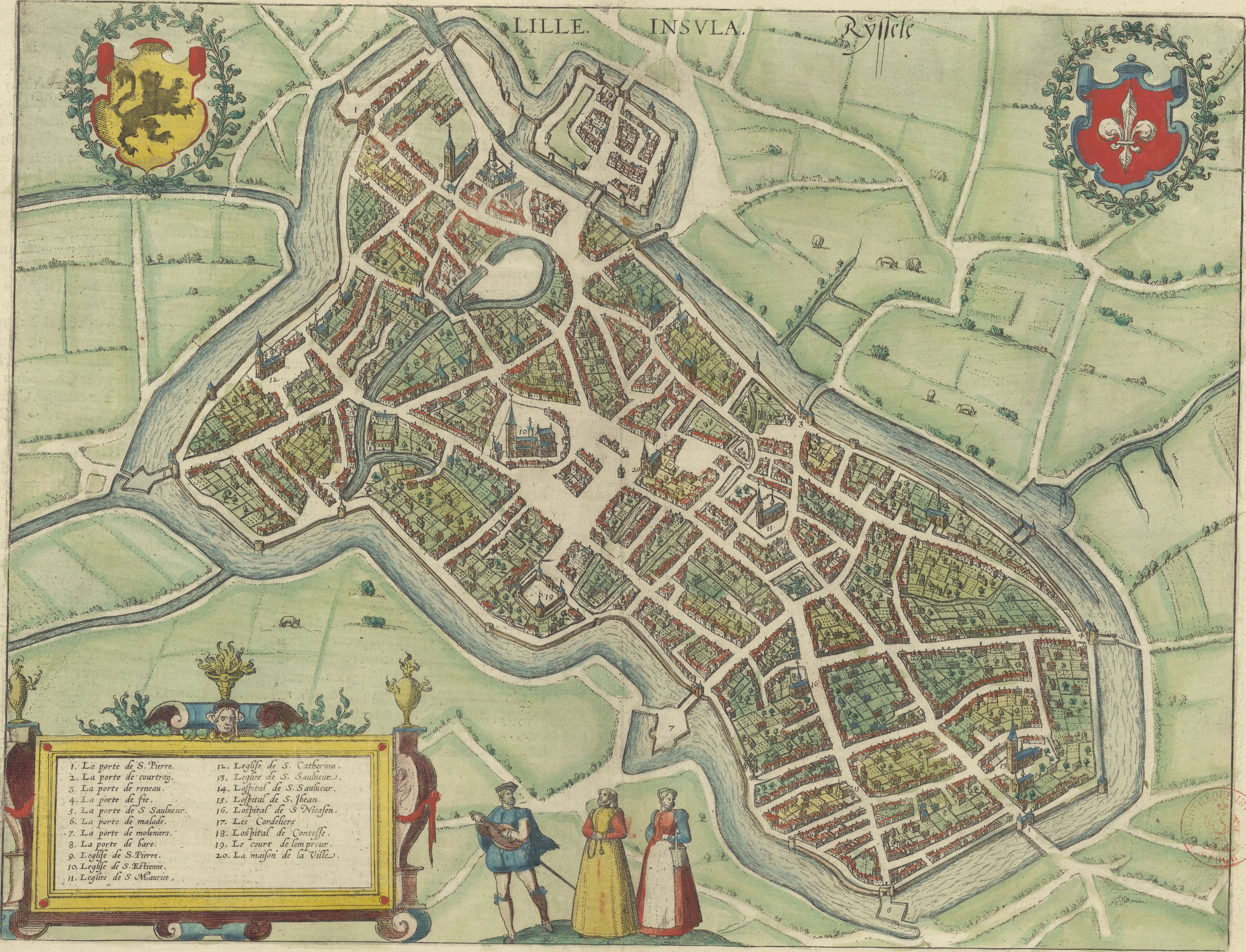
The first map of Lille is by Deventer in 1560 or Guicciadrini in 1580, with the Grand-Place in the center of the map.

In 1550, a guardhouse was built on the site of the old butcher's shop. The "Nouvelles Boucheries" on the first floor of the building were adorned with a Dutch lion. At the same time, a grain market was held on the square. Forty-four years later, the alderman's hall was enlarged and embellished.

In the mid-seventeenth century, the town was obliged to maintain a large garrison of Spanish troops during the War of Devolution. To meet these expenses, the commune sold the houses in the center of the square. The new owner had them demolished in order to build new ones, despite the reluctance of the people of Lille. In 1651, the Alderman (Note: The Magistrate/Alderman represents the municipal body of the commune; he is also called "Law".) decided to build a Bourse de Commerce on the Place du Marché at the fountain au Change; on July 30, he also had the Notre-Dame-des-Ardents chapel demolished. In 1652, work began on Julien Destrée's plans and was completed the following year. Inside, many merchants decided to set up a permanent fair, following the example of the Passage du Caire in Paris. From then on, the houses constructed at the same time separated the Place du Marché into the Grand-Place and the Petite-Place, then known as the Place du Théâtre. This was the birth of the Grand'Place. It is 420 feet long and 220 feet wide. In 1664, the Alderman moved from his aldermanic hall on the Grand'Place to the Palais Rihour.

In 1668, the Treaty of Aix-la-Chapelle gave the city of Lille to France. Years later, in 1683 and 1684, to improve traffic flow, the parking of coal carts and brewers was prohibited. The following year, in 1685, Louis XIV's engineers planned to adorn the square with an equestrian statue of the king and two fountains to impose the royal imprint. The project never saw the light of day due to the war. Then, in 1700, the floor of the Grand-Place was raised by two feet. In 1717, the Grande Garde was built in place of the guardhouse, modifying the façade.

=== Contemporary era: up to the Place du Général-de-Gaulle ===
As the French Revolution broke out, the First Coalition set out. In 1792, after the Battle of Marquain, Theobald de Dillon, already in agony, died in a pyre lit on the Grand'Place, and one of his executioners was guillotined in roughly the same spot on July 13 of the same year. Also in 1792, on May 1, a liberty tree over a hundred feet high was planted. Then, during the siege of Lille, bombing raids set fire to the church of Saint-Étienne and undermined a turret on the bourse de commerce. In spite of this, some locals had fun with the cannonballs thrown by the Austrians. At the end of the war, the town council erected a stage in the square. It featured a pyramid with French flags and war memorabilia at the base and a representation at the top. A procession made up of the town council and citizen commissioners of the National Convention made its way to the square. After the reading of the law, La Marseillaise was intoned. In the evening, the stage was to be illuminated, but rain prevented the lanterns from being lit.

In 1803, during Napoleon I's visit to Lille, the Grand-Place welcomed a huge esplanade at its center, accompanied by a Greek temple built in a circle, which was illuminated at dusk. Many people from Lille and abroad came to see it. Under the First Empire and the Restoration, public construction was limited to occasional operations, and then at the end of the Hundred Days, the inhabitants of the square held a grand celebration of Henri IV and the Bourbon family. In 1845, in honor of the resistance of the people of Lille to the siege of 1792, the column of the Goddess was inaugurated in the center of the square. Towards the end of the 19th century, horse-drawn and steam-powered streetcars crisscrossed the square.

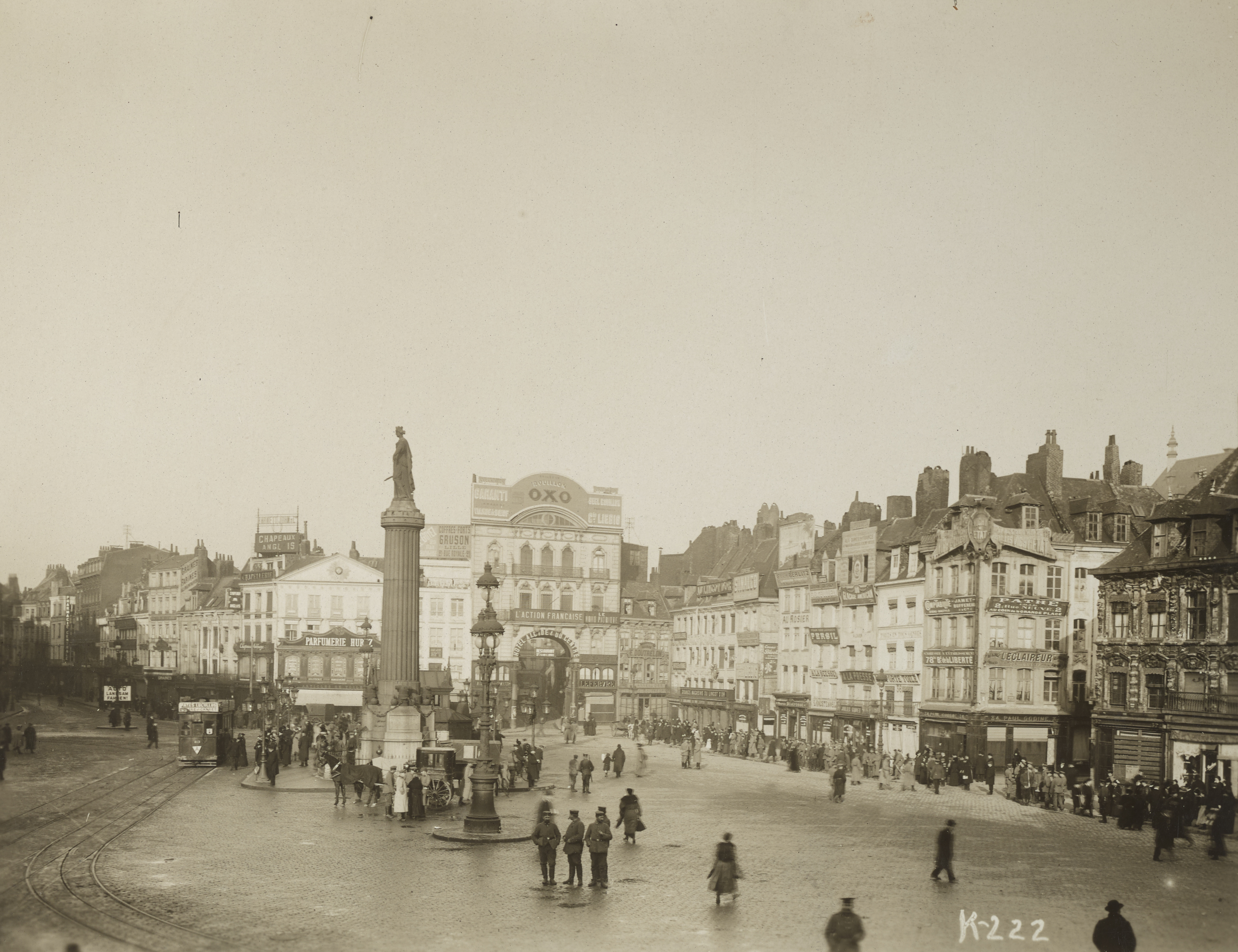
Lille's Grand'Place during World War I

At the beginning of the 20th century, the west side of the square was known as the "rang des cafés", where several cafés coexisted; the headquarters of the newspaper L'Écho du Nord was located in a small building between the Grande Garde and a café. During World War I, the Intendantur took up residence at no. 25. After the war, the "Amis de Lille" decorated the Grand-Place for the homecoming of the 43rd Infantry Regiment in 1919, with garlands of greenery, then again for the arrival of the President of the French Republic, Paul Deschanel, in 1920. To demonstrate its supremacy, in 1936 the newspaper L'Écho du Nord built an eight-story townhouse next to the Grande Garde. During World War II, on June 1, 1940, General Alfred Wäger honored the resistance of General Molinié's troops in front of the Bellevue hotel-restaurant. With the purge that followed the Liberation, the building, previously occupied by the daily the Grand Echo du Nord, reverted to La Voix du Nord, Nord Libre, and Liberté. The square was renamed the "Place du Général-de-Gaulle" in September 1944.

In order to excavate the underground parking lot in 1989, test pits were dug as early as 1986, and excavations followed for eight consecutive months in 1988 and 1989. At the end of the works, the Grand-Place became partially pedestrianized, the paving of the street was redone on a sand screed and the Ferris wheel made its first appearance for the Christmas market held on the Place Rihour. Twenty years on, some of the cobblestones failed to withstand the passage of buses and have been temporarily replaced by Macadam.

From February 15 to June 30, 2011, the Place du Général-de-Gaulle was resurfaced on a concrete bed to consolidate the cobblestones. After this period, a strolling zone was set up and a terrace charter was introduced. In the summer of 2016, access for cars crossing the square was made one-way.

However, the most remarkable fact about this square is that, since 2004, Lille has been designated a European Capital of Culture, allowing the square to be the venue for temporary art exhibitions and festivities.

== Architecture and monuments ==
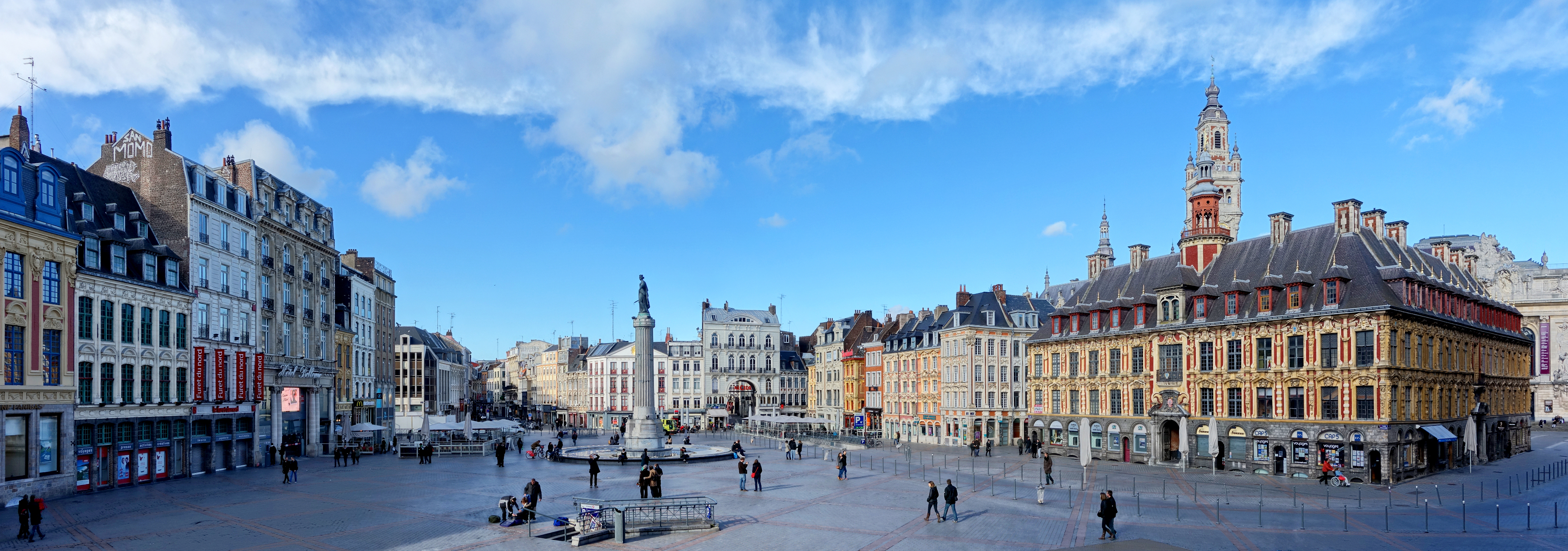
Panoramic view of the Place du Général-de-Gaulle in 2014. In the center, the Goddess column and on the right, the Vieille Bourse.

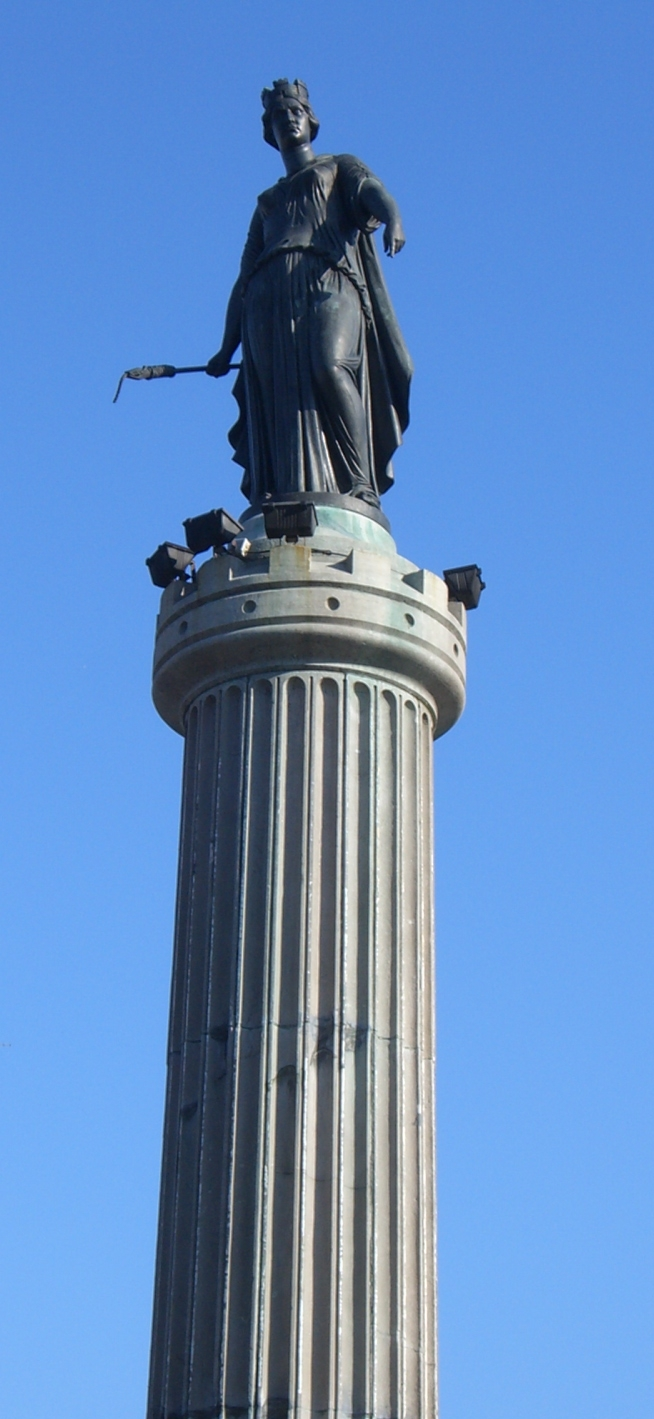
The Column of the Goddess

=== Column of the Goddess ===
The column commemorating the siege of 1792, commonly known as the Column of the Goddess, has occupied the center of the square since 1845 to commemorate the city's resistance to the Austrian siege of 1792. It was originally intended to decorate the Place Rihour. The foundation stone was laid on October 8, 1842; the statue was inaugurated three years later, on October 8, 1845.

The marble column was designed by Charles Benvignat, while the bronze statue was sculpted by Théophile Bra. The mural-crowned statue symbolizes the city, defending itself with a blaze in its hand.

=== Buildings ===
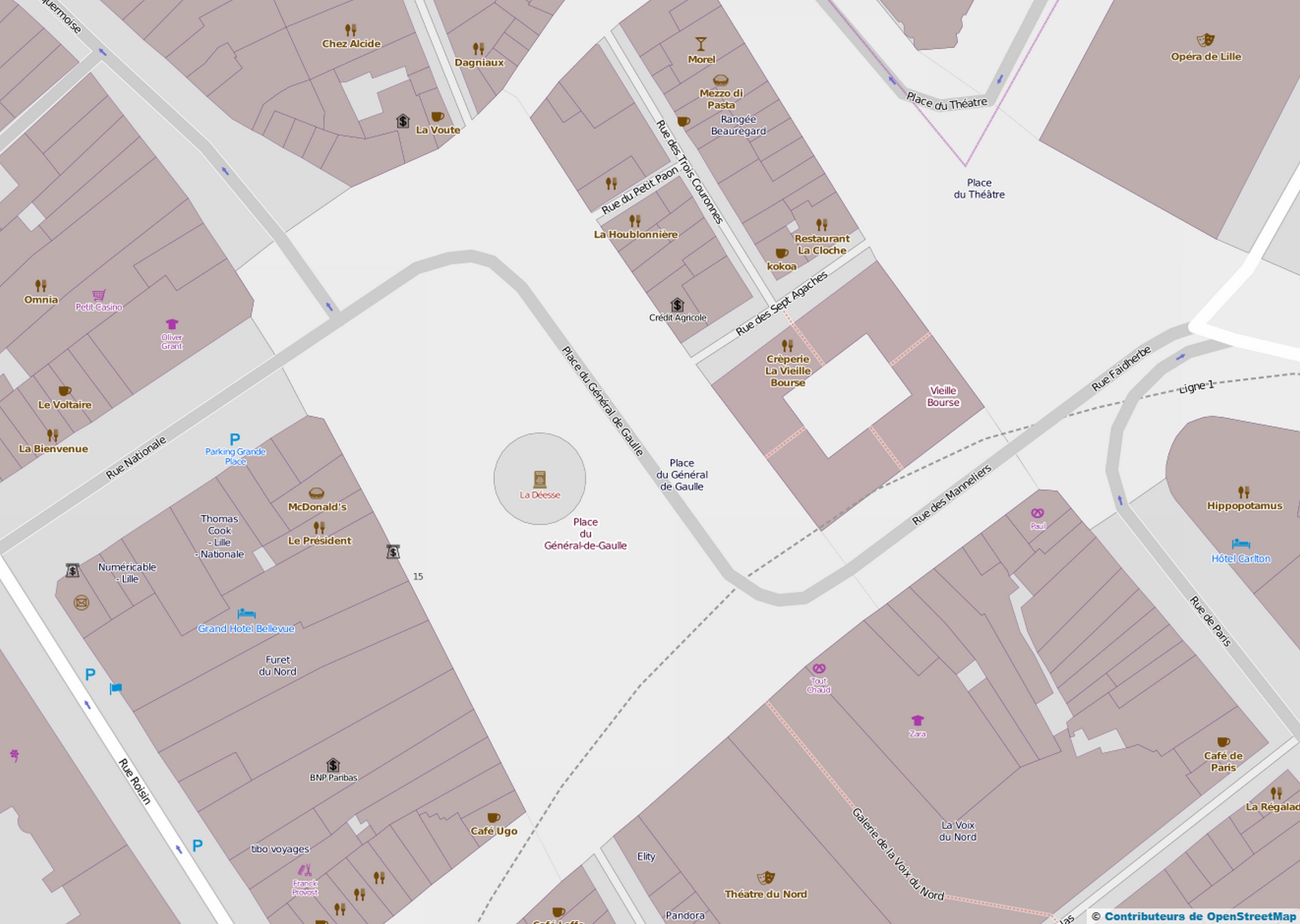
The square and its buildings

The buildings around the Grand Place represent a panorama of Lille's architecture between the 17th and 20th centuries.

The oldest building still standing is the Vieille Bourse. The building, with its typical 17th century Flemish Renaissance architecture, separates the Grand'Place from the Place du Théâtre. Composed of twenty-four identical interlocking residences enclosing an inner courtyard, it was built to plans by Julien Destrée in 1652 and completed the following year. A former stock exchange, it housed Lille's Chamber of Commerce until the 19th century, and has since been home to numerous secondhand booksellers. Listed as a historic monument since 1921, It is located at no. 30.

Next comes the Grande Garde, built in 1717 by Thomas-Joseph Gombert to house the royal guard corps. The building's classical façade, in white stone and sandstone on the Place du Général-de-Gaulle side, has been listed as a historic monument since 1925. It is now the Théâtre du Nord at no. 4.

More than two hundred years later, in 1936, the building housing the local newspaper La Voix du Nord was built on its right-hand side. This building, originally belonging to the Grand Écho du Nord newspaper, was designed by Albert Laprade. Its façade is reminiscent of the sparrow-stepped gable, customary in the Flemish tradition. The neo-Flemish façade, featuring the coats of arms of the region's main towns, is topped by a bronze statue of the Three Graces, symbolizing the region's three former provinces: Flanders, Artois and Hainaut. It is the work of Raymond Couvègnes. The first floor houses a shopping mall. It is located at no. 8.

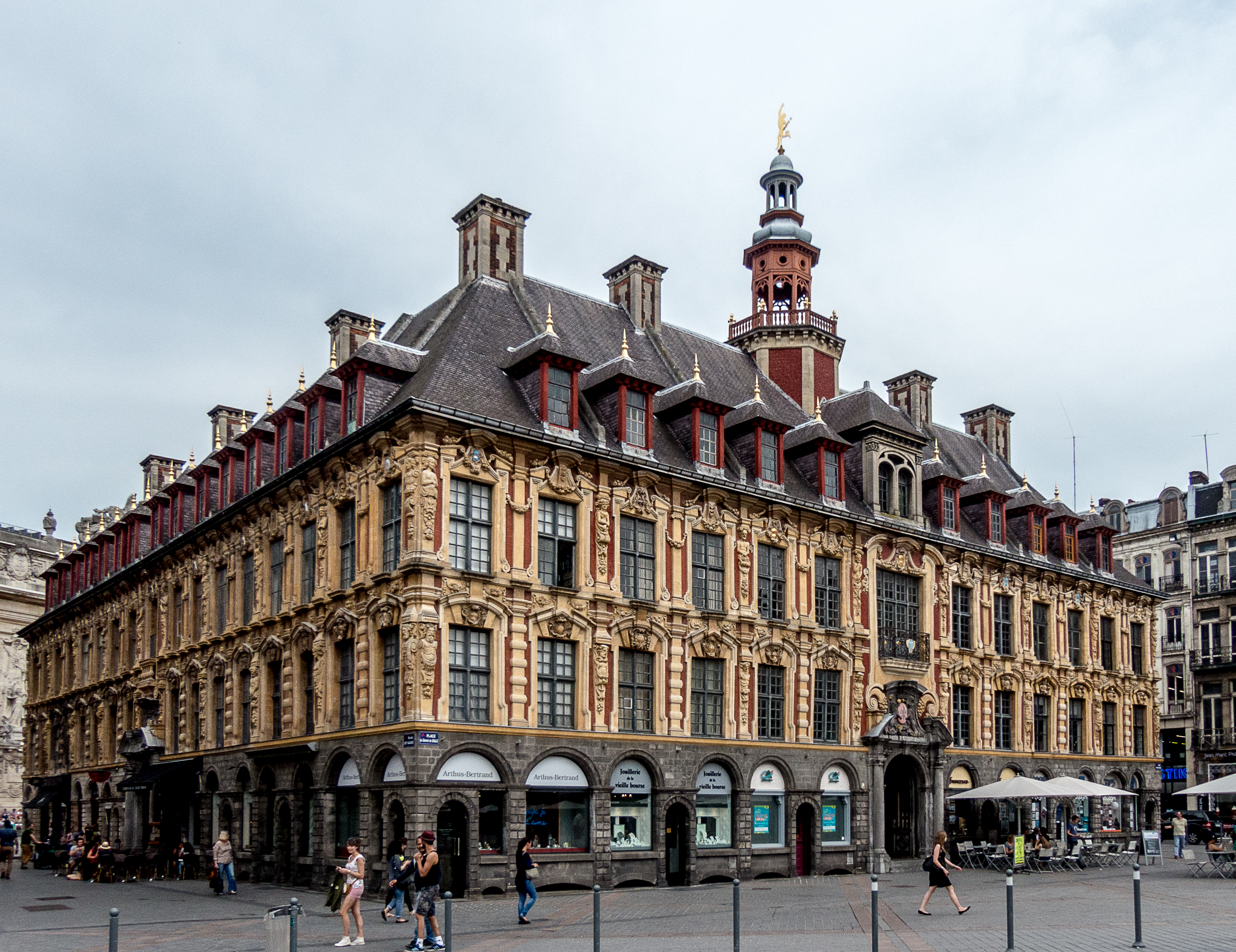
Vieille Bourse

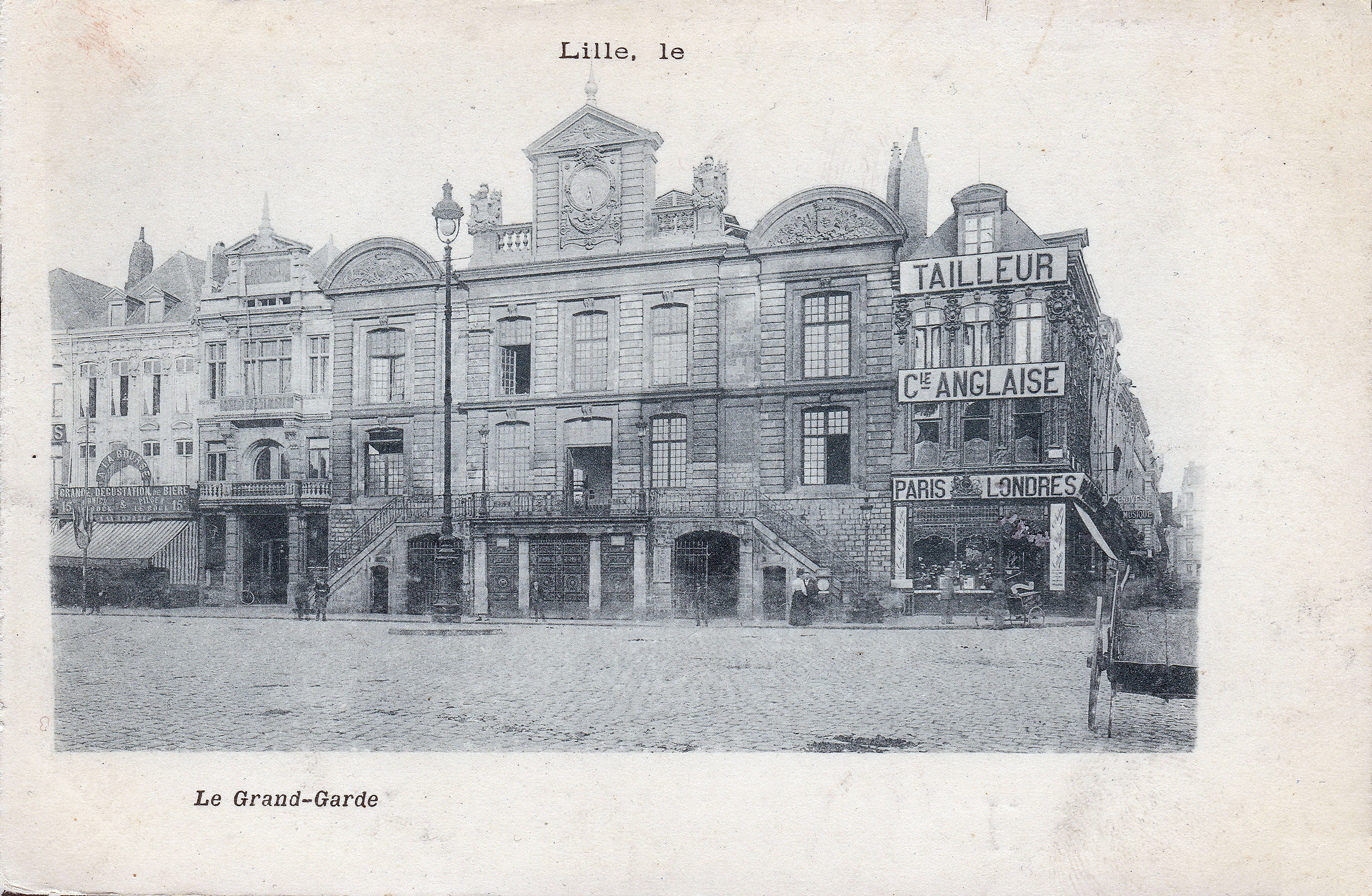
Théâtre du Nord

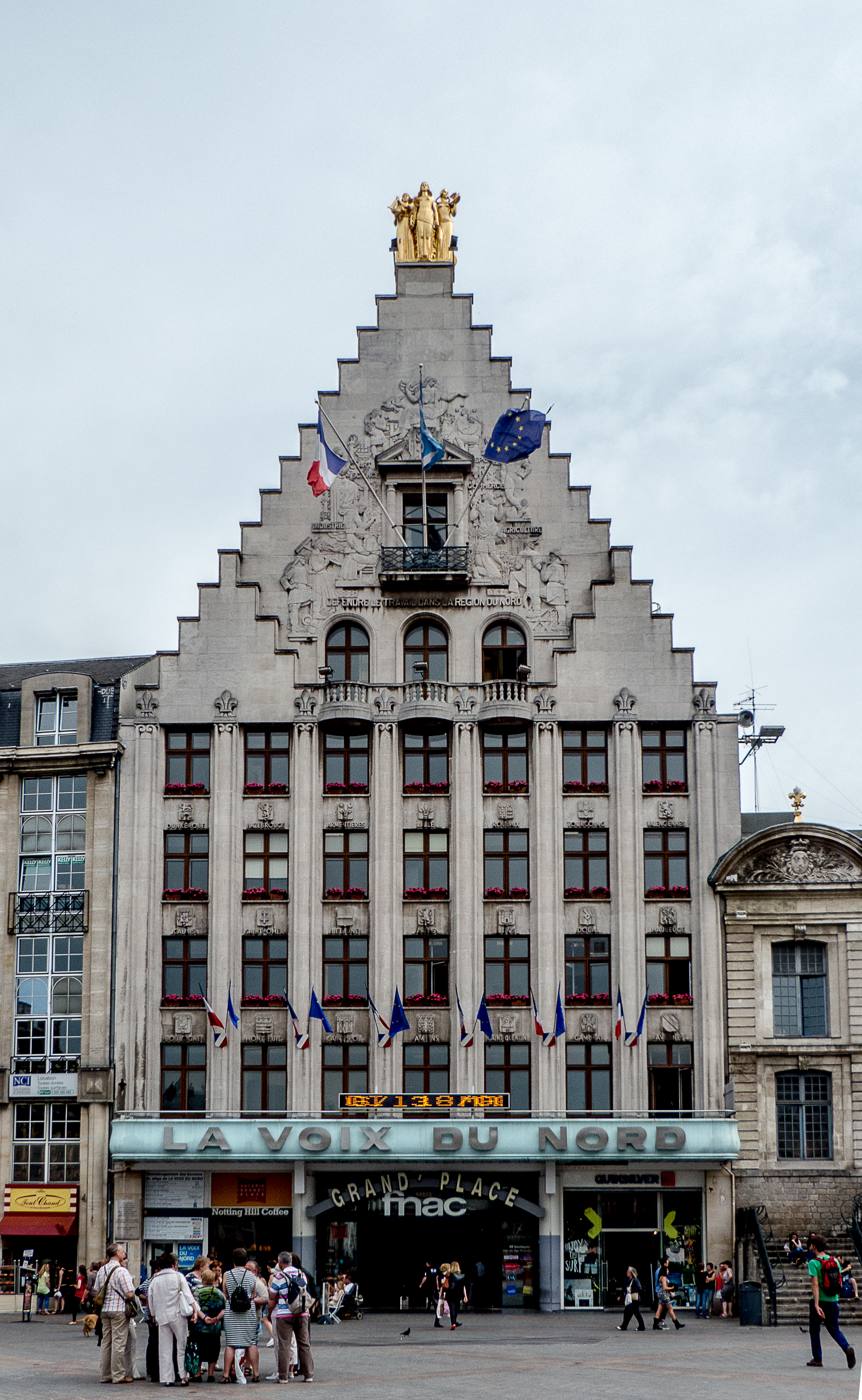
Building of La Voix du Nord

=== Homes, properties and hotels ===
Four building lots are listed as historic monuments in Lille. The building at the corner of the Rue Neuve and the Place du Général-de-Gaulle has been listed, with the exception of the first floor, since May 25, 1945. The façades and roofs of nos. 9, 21, 34, 44 and 52 have been listed as historic monuments since March 9 and March 14, 1944, respectively for the first two, and June 8, 1966, for the last three.

The town house at nos. 64-66 dates back to 1455. Two hundred and twenty years later, the new owner completely demolished it, rebuilt it identically and modified the cellar. In 1828, a third story was added, topped by a pediment with a sun.

The date of construction of the Hotel Bellevue is not known. The hotel hosted Mozart during his European tour in 1765. Located in a former bourgeois residence and accessible from the Rue Jean-Roisin, the hotel overlooks the square. The adjacent building, housing the Furet du Nord, was refurbished in 1969; the 19th-century façade was restored to match the 18th-century style in 1990.

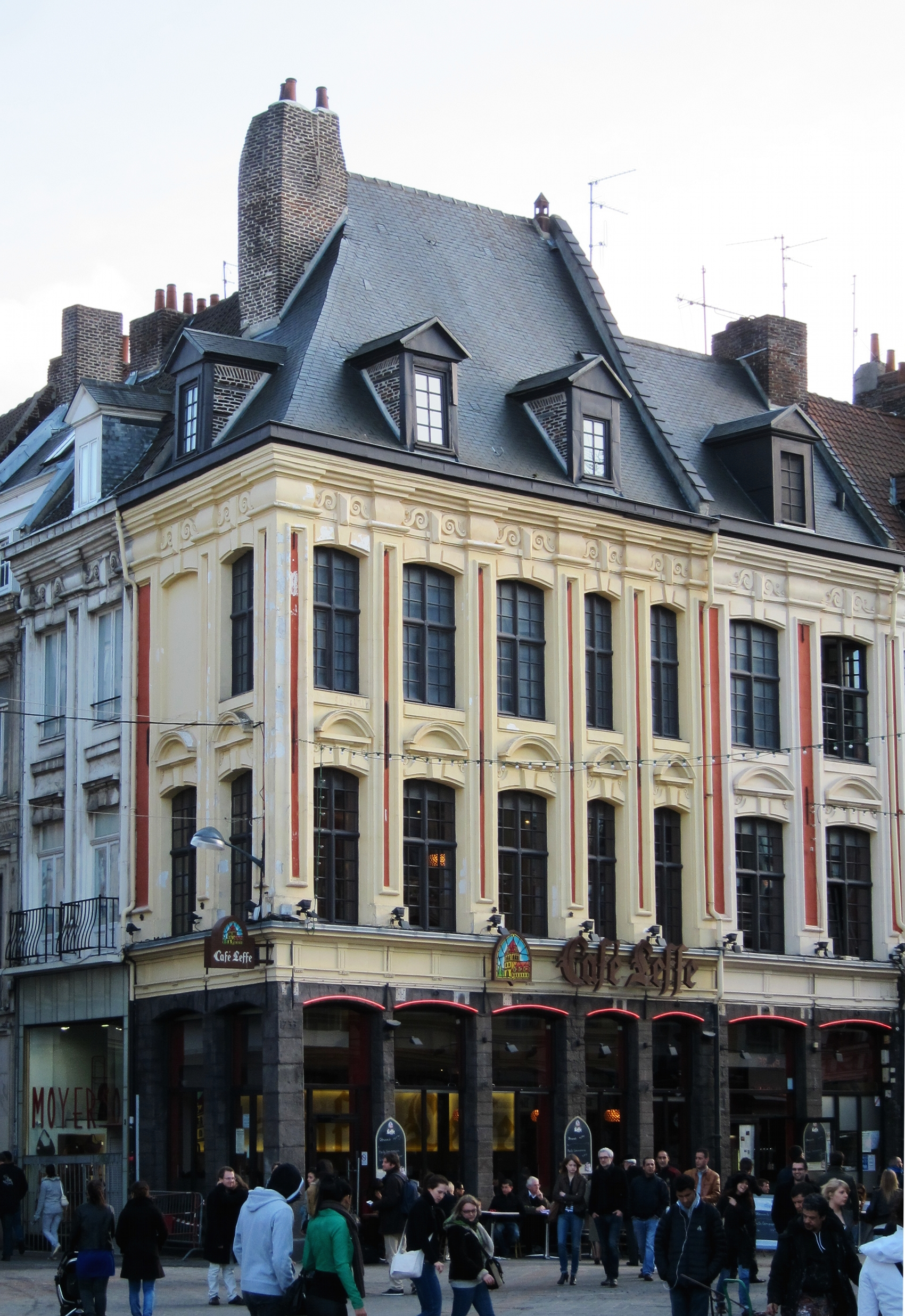
Building on the corner of the Rue Neuve, listed as a historic monument

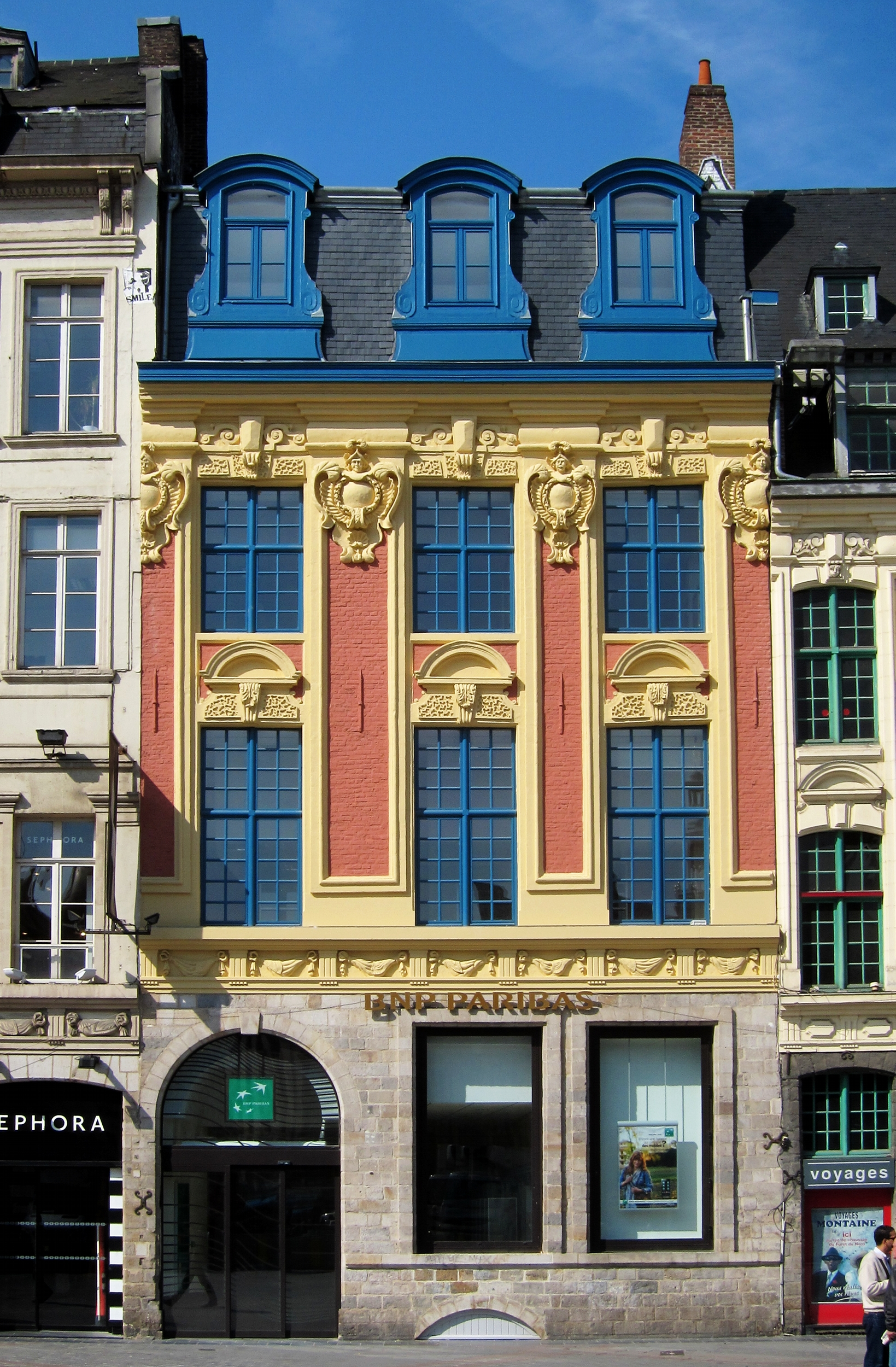
Building no. 9 listed as a historical monument

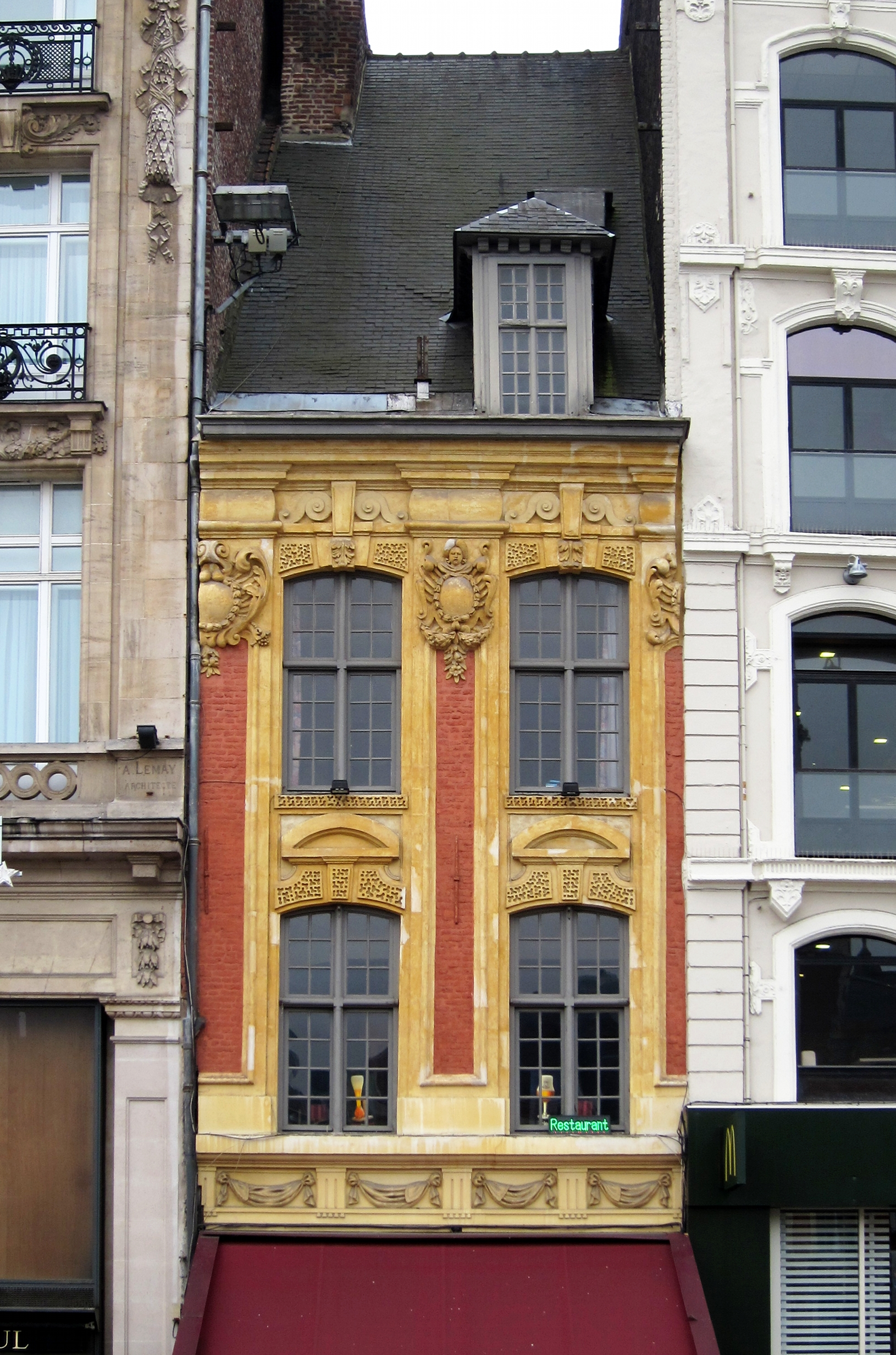
Building no. 21 listed as a historical monument

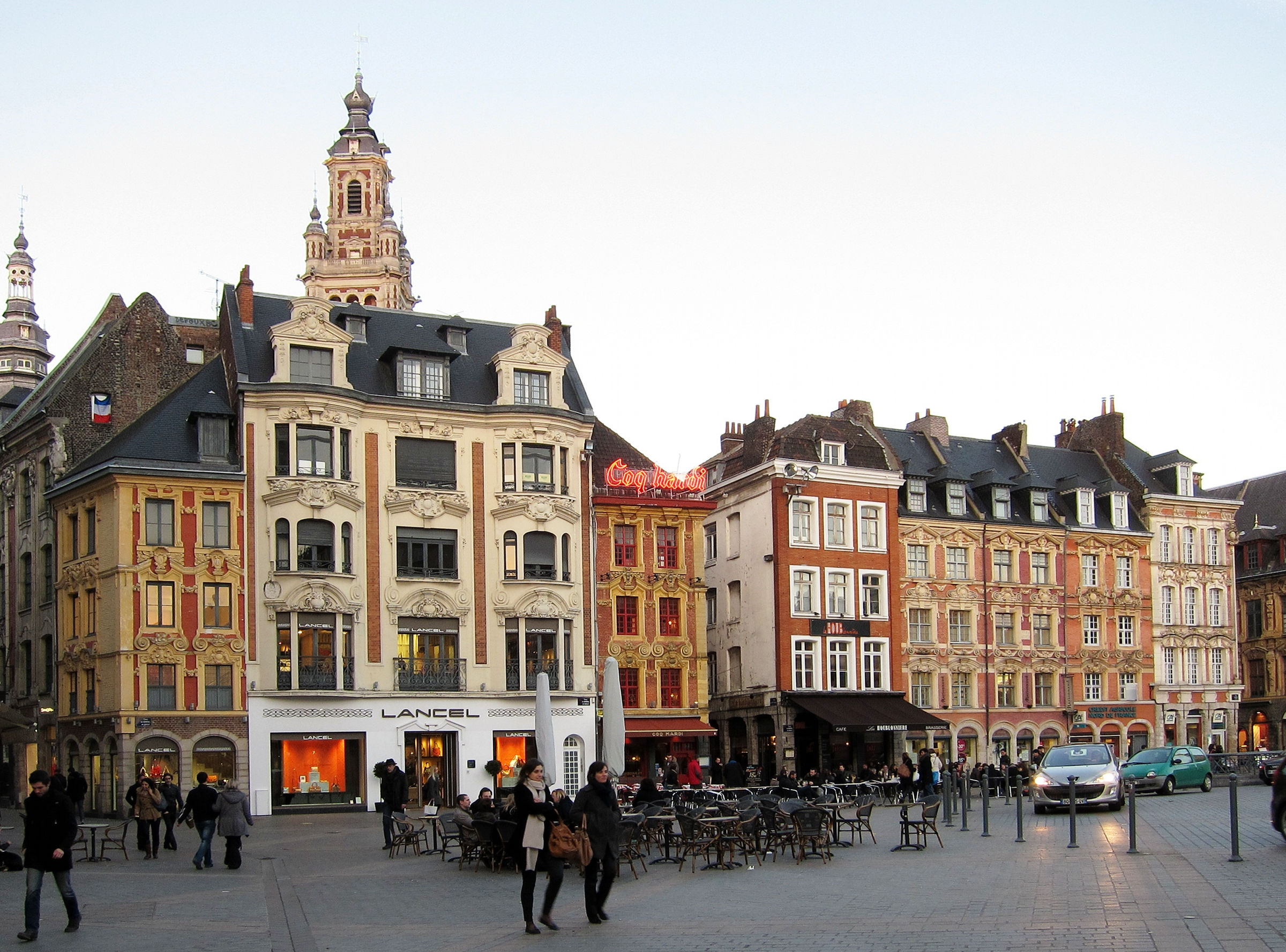
Buildings nos. 34, 44 and 52 listed as historic monuments

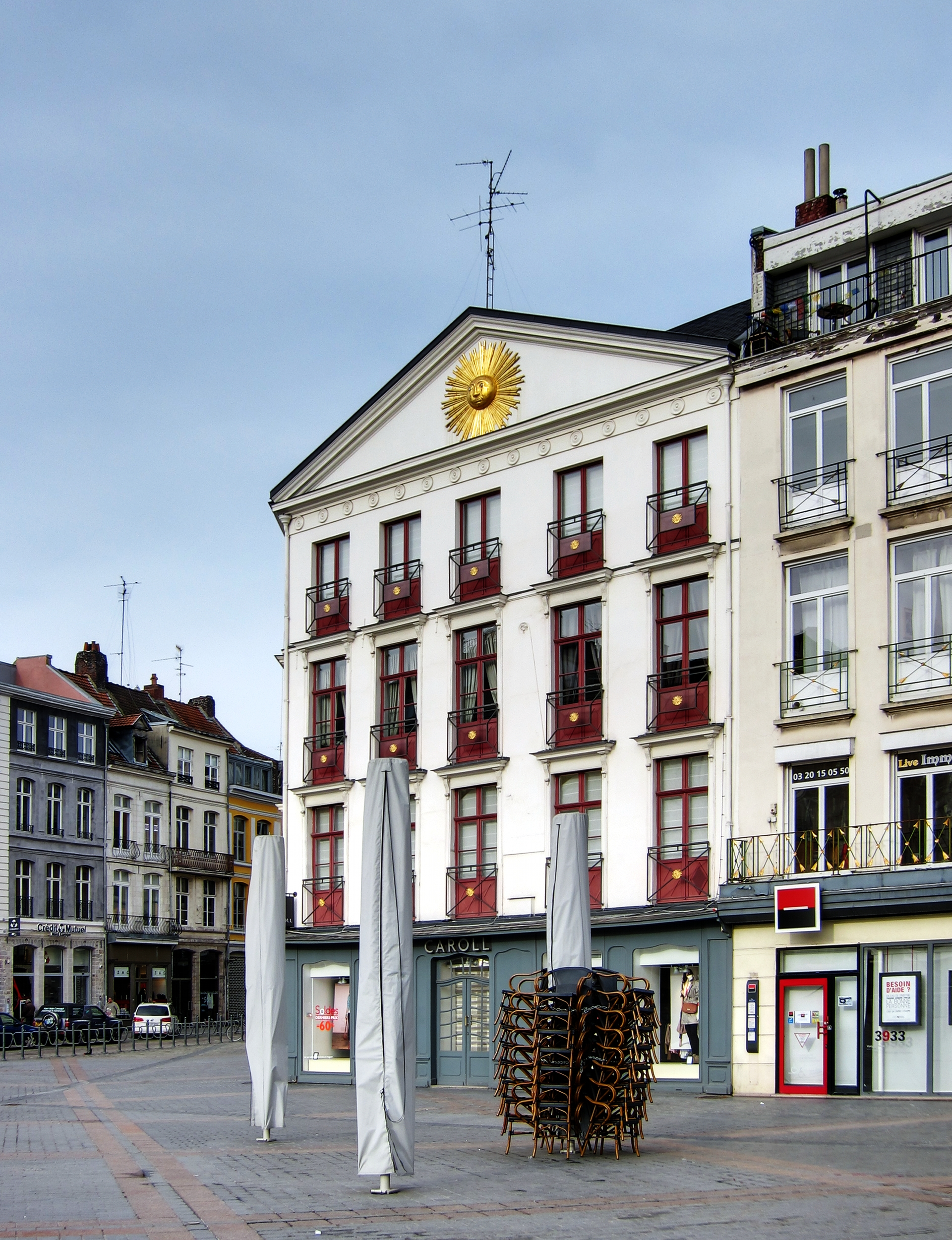
Building no. 64-66 of the former Beau Soleil sign

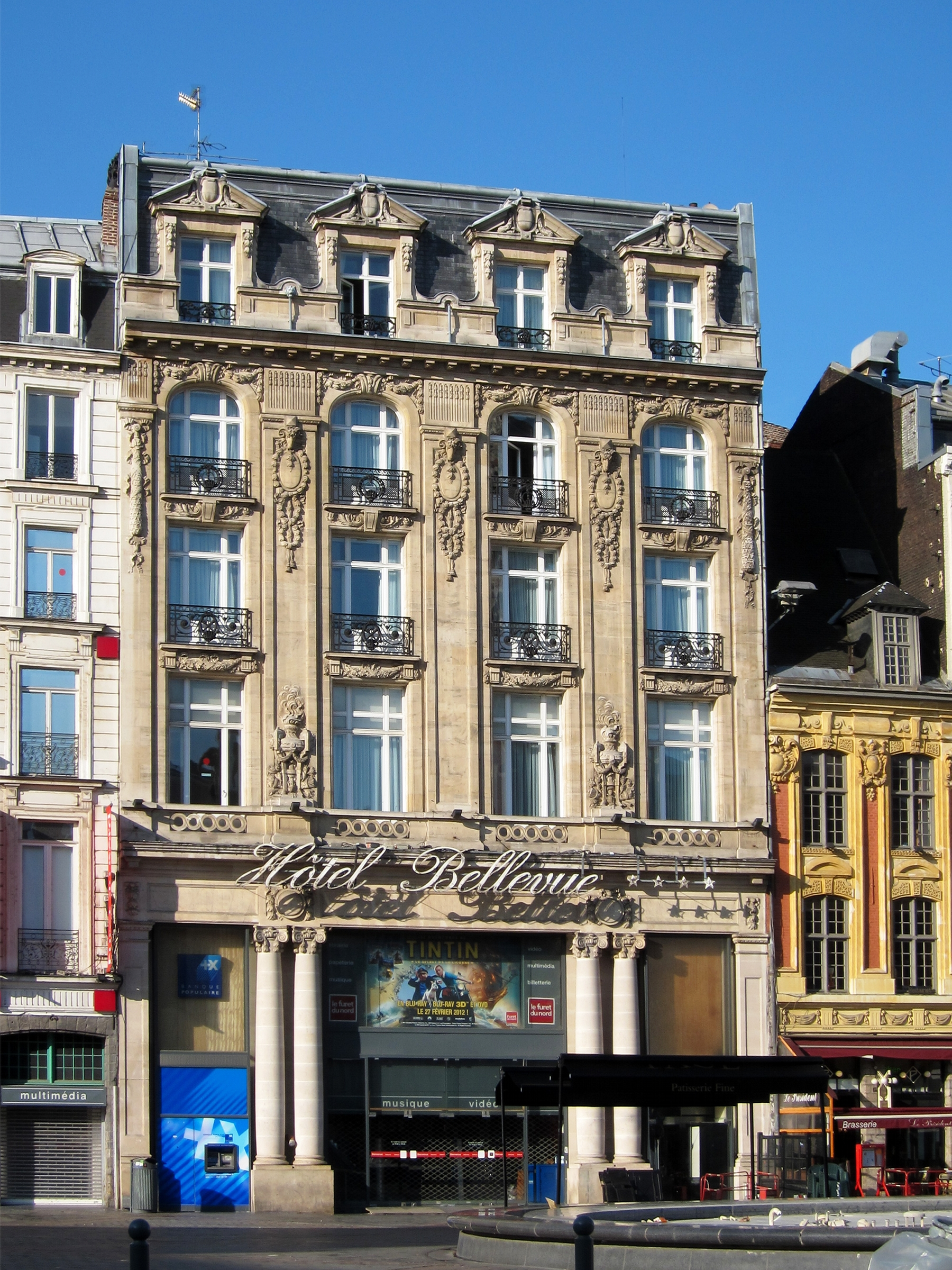
Hôtel Bellevue

== Uses ==
Common in the southern Netherlands, the Grand-Place is the main square of the municipality and the site of large markets and festivals.

=== Commercial, trade and economic ===
Since the Middle Ages, the market has sold wheat from the southern countryside to Flanders under a hall-type building in the 13th century, then under small stalls at the beginning of the following century. By mid-century, a regular market had sprung up, selling virtually everything. Before the construction of the "Vieille Bourse", traders and industrialists met every day except Sunday lunchtimes and evenings on the square, near the Fountain of Change and the Chapel of the Ardents. Initiated by Margaret of Constantinople, the annual fair contributed to the town's economic activity. Previously part of the annual fair, the Braderie de Lille replaced it over time. The latter still takes place on the square.

As of the early 2010s, the Place du Général-de-Gaulle is home to a number of stores and restaurants. Founded in 1936 and established in 1959 on Lille's Place du Général-de-Gaulle, Le Furet du Nord is located at no. 15. With 8,000 m^{2} of floor space, it is one of the largest bookstores in Europe and the biggest in France. It is as popular with tourists as the Belfry or the Palais des Beaux-Arts. The Grand'Place shopping arcade lies beneath the La Voix du Nord building and leads to Fnac and the Les Tanneurs shopping center. Separated by the Rue du Petit-Paon, La Houblonnière and Le Coq Hardi are two estaminets on the Place du Général-de-Gaulle. Located at nos. 42 and 44 respectively, their only competition on the square is a McDonald's; other nearby estaminets are to the south, at the start of the Place Rihour. The square is also home to Café Méo, a teahouse and delicatessen at nos. 3–5; Sephora, Nocibé, and Marionnaud, three perfume and cosmetics chains, are at nos. 7, 9, and 40 respectively.

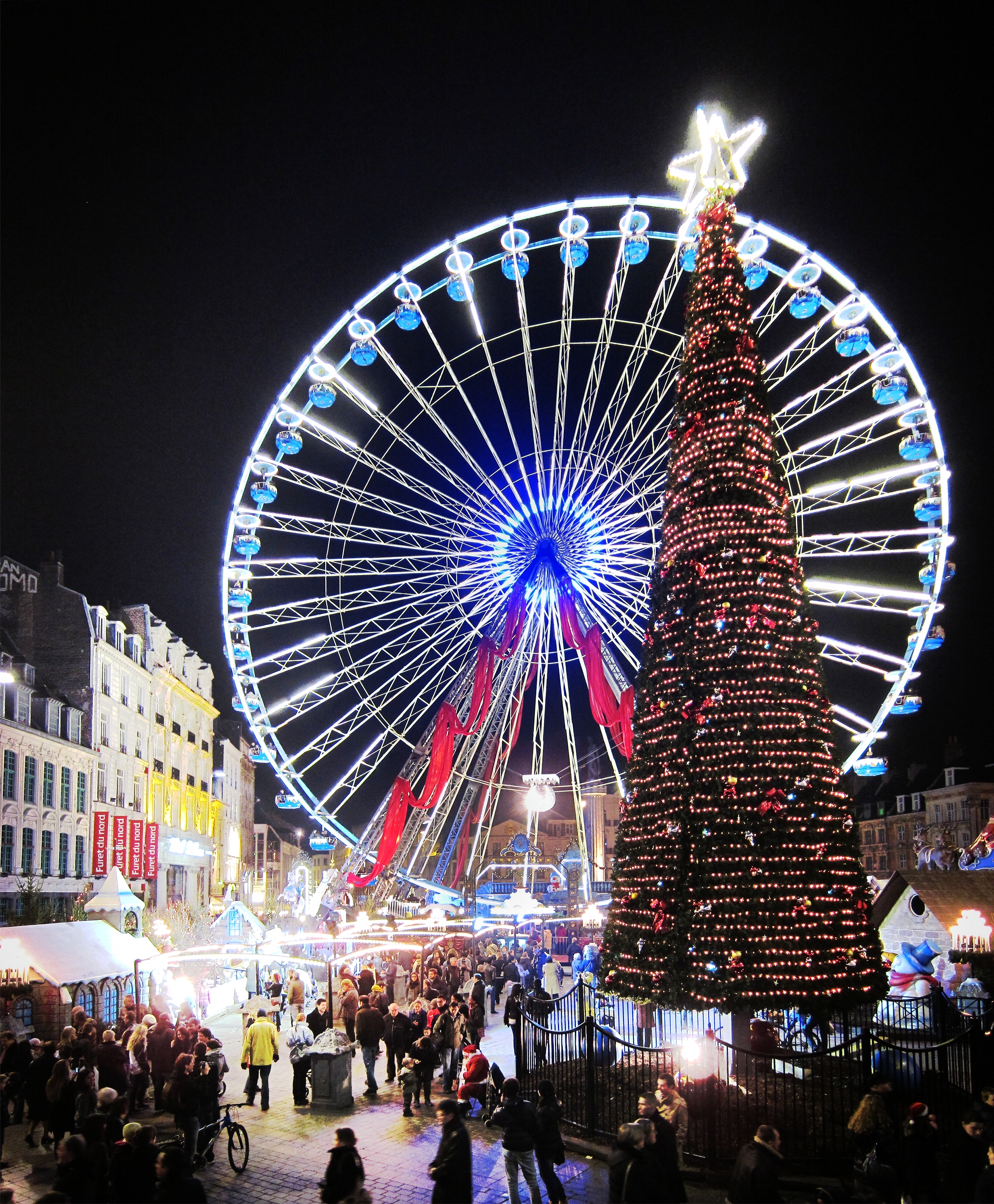
The Ferris wheel, during the Christmas market

=== Cultural, festive and touristic ===
The square was and still is used for official events organized by the municipality for the people of Lille.

The Fête de l'Épinette was created in the 13th century. On Mardi Gras (Shrove Tuesday) each year, the newly appointed king was presented with a thorny branch in the market square, as a reminder of his duty to honor Saint Thorn. He would then place it in the Dominican convent. The following Sunday, tournaments were held on the square, which had been cleared and sanded for the occasion. The jousting stopped in 1486; the festival was suspended from 1470 to 1475, then again in 1516. It was definitively halted by Philip II of Spain in 1556.

On February 5, 1600, the Grand'Place was decorated in honor of the Lille archdukes Albert and Isabelle. Another festival celebrated the birth of Louis XV's first son, in 1729. In 1768, the hundredth anniversary of the arrival of Louis XIV, King of France, was celebrated. In October 1781, a circular temple was built opposite the Grande Garde, in honor of the birth of Louis XVI's eldest son.

Since the elimination of surface parking in 1989, the Grand-Place has become a major urban planning issue. That same year, for the first time, a Ferris wheel was installed on Lille's main square during the Christmas market held on the Place Rihour. Since Lille 2004 and its follow-up, Lille 3000, the square has hosted temporary exhibitions. The square saw a "suspended forest" in 2004, a parade for the inauguration of Lille 3000's "Fantastic" in 2012, and, in spring 2014, a flowerbed made up of crates used as "pixels" by a Lille artist.

For the sake of consistency, parasols, screens, chairs, tables, menu stands, planters, and outdoor lighting, as well as their locations, are regulated. For the Place du Général-de-Gaulle, terraces attached to the façade are limited to a depth of four meters, and offset terraces are authorized in squares of four meters side by side, up to a maximum of four, and limited to a depth of eight meters. A four-meter safety corridor and a flow corridor must be maintained.

=== Military and political ===
In the past, the army used to hold demonstrations of strength, exercises, and parades here every day except Wednesdays and Saturdays, when there was a huge market. On Sundays, the division general would review his troops. For the inauguration of the Goddess Column on October 8, 1845, the troops marched in front of the monument, and Bengal lights illuminated the square in the evening. The garrison's bands played harmony pieces. The following day, a festival was held. In 1915, the birthday of Wilhelm II of Germany was celebrated with a parade of occupying troops, a concert, and a fireworks display. In 1919, for the homecoming of the 43rd infantry regiment, the square was decorated with garlands of greenery.

The square was home to the alderman's hall and belfry, where the commune's municipal administration was based. The square was used for executions and featured a pillory. In addition to sellers of counterfeit coins, the forged Baldwin I in 1225 and Theobald de Dillon in 1792 was assassinated here. People from outside Lille, but belonging to the châtellenie, who beat, wounded, or killed a Lille resident, were executed under the banners and musical instruments.

In 1925, the funeral of the commune's former socialist mayor, Gustave Delory, took place here.

=== Religious ===
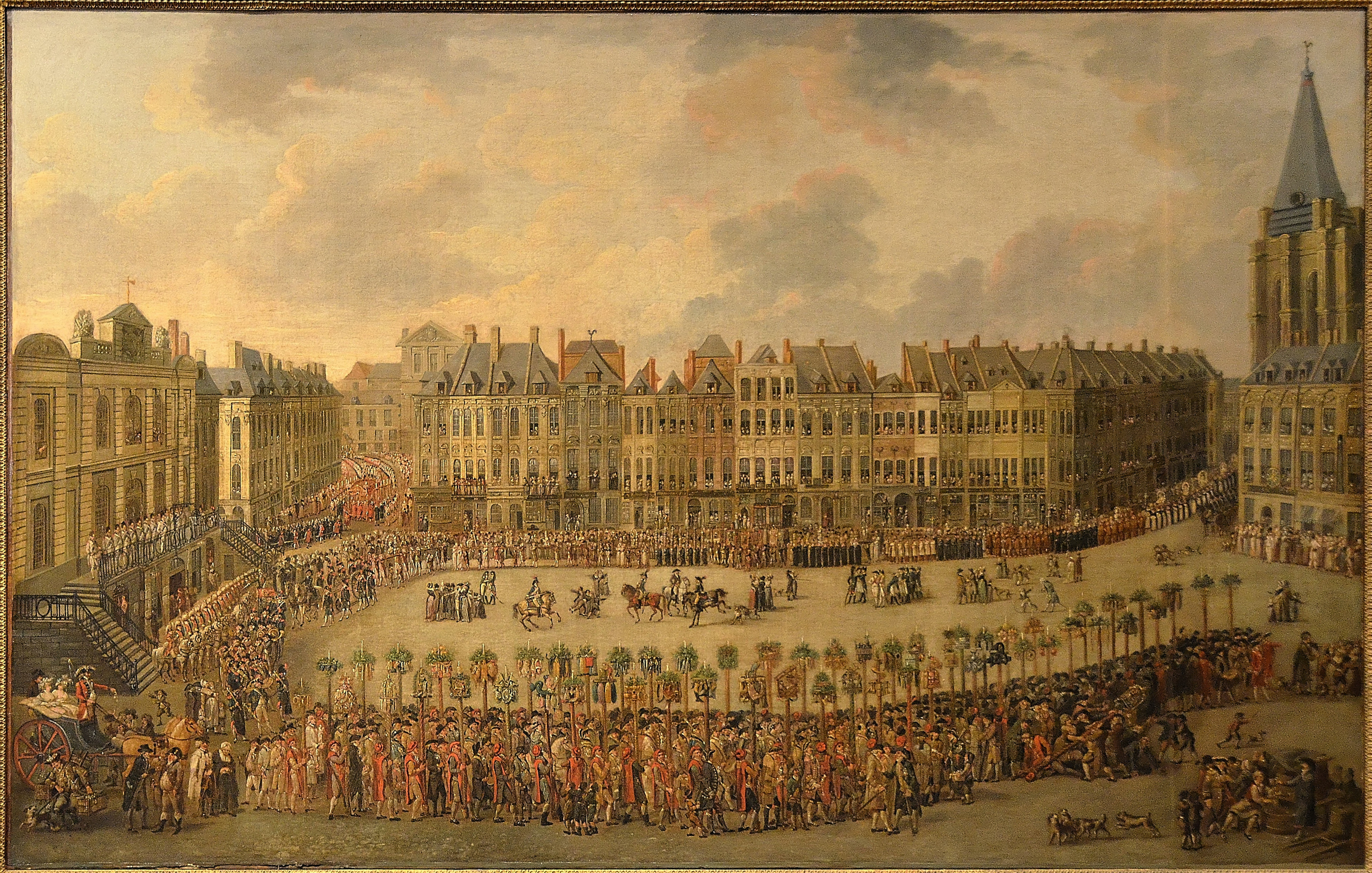
La Procession de Lille, on the Grand-Place, by François Watteau (1801)

In February 1269, Marguerite of Constantinople, at the request of the canons of the Collegiate Church of Saint-Pierre, instituted the Procession. This religious festival honored Notre-Dame-de-la-Treille. All the people of Lille and the whole of Flanders were invited, including the Alderman and the clergy. From June 24 to July 2, 1845, the secular jubilee of Notre-Dame-de-la-Treille took place, with the procession passing through the square.

The square also included the Saint-Étienne church and the Chapelle des Ardents, two religious buildings that have now been destroyed.

== In the arts ==
The Grand'Place was painted by François Watteau, known as Watteau de Lille. The painting, entitled La Procession de Lille, is on display at the Musée de l'Hospice Comtesse in Lille. In this painting, the Grande Garde is defended at the bottom by a row of horsemen in red uniforms and another row of infantrymen on the second floor.

In the late 2000s, the square was also used as the setting for the post-apocalyptic video game Leelh. This takes place in a re-imagined 2087 version of Lille after a cataclysm in 2060.

== See also ==
- Rue Esquermoise
- Vieux-Lille

== Bibliography ==
- Blieck, Gilles (1988). "Lille: Place du Général-de-Gaulle". Archéologie de la France - Informations (in French). Archived from the original on 19 October 2015.
- Bruneel, Henri (1848). Histoire populaire de Lille. Danel.
- Clabaut, Jean-Denis (2001). Les caves médiévales de Lille. Histoire et Civilisations (in French). Villeneuve-d'Ascq: Presses universitaires du septentrion. Archived from the original on 17 June 2016.
- Derode, Victor (1848). "Station sur la Grande-Place". Histoire de Lille et de la Flandre Wallonne (in French). Librairie de Vanackere. pp. 76–82. Archived from the original on 4 July 2015.
- Estager, Jacques (1986). Ami, entends-tu: la résistance populaire dans le Nord-Pas-de-Calais (in French). Messidor. ISBN 978-2-209-05837-2.
- Guiffray, Alain; Blieck, Gilles (1994). "Genèse et évolution d'une place publique. L'exemple de Lille". Actes des congrès de la Société d'archéologie médiévale (in French): 207–224. Archived from the original on 24 December 2022.
- Quarré-Reybourbon, Louis (1885). Chronique d'une maison Lilloise: racontée par ses parchemins (in French). Louis Quarré-Reybourbon. Archived from the original on 25 August 2018.
- Thiery, Virginie; Zamolo, Chantal; Langlet, Valérie (2012). Laissez-vous conter la Grand'Place de Lille (in French). Villes et Pays d'art. Archived from the original on 31 January 2017.
