= Furet du Nord =

Bookstore chain in France

- Company type: Société anonyme
- Industry: Retailer
- Founded: 1936; 90 years ago in Lille
- Founder: Georges Poulard
- Headquarters: Lomme, France
- Number of locations: 20
- Area served: Nord, France
- Key people: Pierre Coursières; Paul Callens (1923-2009)
- Products: Books; Stationery; Music; Multimedia
- Revenue: €81,226,000 (2018)
- Net income: €2,024,000 (2018)
- Subsidiaries: Decitre
- Website: www.furet.com (in French)

Furet du Nord is a chain of bookstores in the Nord department of France. Its origins date back to 1936 when a fur store located on Rue de la Vieille-Comédie in Lille was transformed into a bookstore. It retained its name, referring to a local tradition: rabbit hunting with ferrets.

Today, the flagship store is located in Lille on the Grand Place. It was established in 1959 and was the largest bookstore in the world from 1992 to 1999. It is still one of the largest bookshops in France.

== History ==
Furet du Nord was originally a fur shop located on Rue de la Vieille-Comédie in Lille. High school principal Georges Poulard transformed the 750 sq ft fur shop into a bookstore in 1936. Despite the nature of the business changing, the new owner decided to keep the original name, Furet du Nord.

In 1947, Paul Callens began working at Furet du Nord. He had a passion for books despite coming from a family where his father, a butcher in Tourcoing, did not understand or indulge in his passion. Dissatisfied with his position as a salesman and the shop's size, Callens wanted to purchase the shop despite not having enough money. Later in 1950, he told his dreams of buying the bookshop to his dairymaid friend, Florence, who took a tin box from the cellar wrapped in a newspaper containing her savings. Callens bought the bookstore with the savings the next day. While at a café, Callens heard that Galleries Barbès was closing their furniture store on the Place du Général-de-Gaulle in Lille, and he had the idea of moving Furet there. There were other contenders for the location such as the Renault company, so Callens made his first trip to Paris to plead his case with the management of Galleries Barbès. He convinced the management with plans for his bookstore, and it opened on 1 August 1959. It initially had a space of 20 m^{2} which later expanded to 600 m^{2}. Its grand opening was in 1960. Furet du Nord became the first self-service bookstore and was also the first bookstore in France to open a department of pocketbooks in the basement in 1963; a youth department was built in the basement in 1970.

In 1982, Paul Callens' family business became a public company and began to open other stores in the area. Furet du Nord's area expanded from 500 m^{2} to 7,000 m^{2} between the years of 1982 to 1992. Today, it hosts an average of 12,000 daily visitors. In 1996, Furet du Nord opened its first online bookstore. The site now offers 350,000 French language references. Furet du Nord is now owned by Extrapole, a chain of multimedia cultural stores, and its shareholder Lagardère Services, acquired in July 1999.

In the summer of 2001, Lagardère (formerly Hachette Distribution Services) acquired the French network of Virgin Megastores and became the second-largest French group that specialized in distributing cultural products (ahead of the French group Pinault Printemps Redoute). Due to regional fame, Furet du Nord retained its name. At the beginning of November 2007, Lagardère announced that it was in exclusive negotiations with the French investment fund Butler Capital Partners (BCP). At the end of November, the works council unanimously accepted the change of the main shareholding, with the acquisition of a stake of about 80% in the Virgin/Furet investment fund. The same month, the group announced that the bookstore located in Boulogne-sur-Mer since 1990 was to close at the end of January 2008. In the summer of 2008, two subsidiaries of the regional bank of Crédit Agricole in Nord de France, Vauban Partners (Paris) and Participex Gestion (Lille) took control of the capital. This operation made it possible to repay the debt (€15 million) and contributed €10 million in equity.

Starting with the separation from Virgin Megastores, Furet du Nord changed its commercial strategy. On 15 October 2009, Furet launched furet.com and began distributing more than a million books on the Web. In mid-September 2010, the eleventh bookstore opened in the Englos-les-Géants shopping centre. In June 2011, a new boutique opened in Cité Europe in Coquelles, near Calais. At the end of October 2011, the first Furet du Nord bookstore outside the Nord-Pas-de-Calais region opened; it was in the La Vache-Noire shopping centre, in Arcueil, south of Paris. The brand continued its expansion in the shopping centres of Île-de-France by settling in that of Le Kremlin-Bicêtre, named Okabé, 16 October 2012. In 2013, the brand returned to Dunkerque, after having left in 2000. It replaced the Virgin Megastore after it went into liquidation.

Furet du Nord made an offer to purchase the Sauramps bookstore in Montpellier, but on 19 July 2017, the Montpellier tribunal de commerce chose a different offer by François Fontès, head of Amétis, a real estate group specializing in social housing. In 2018, Furet du Nord expanded outside of France with the purchase of Chapitre.be (formerly Agora) which has two stores in Belgium.

In November and December 2018, Furet du Nord announced the acquisition of Decitre, which opened up access to the Rhône-Alpes region, in addition to an increased presence on the Internet. This acquisition was formalized on 18 January 2019, making Furet du Nord the fourth-largest bookseller in France. The group achieved a turnover of €82 million in 2018, of which €52 million is in the book market.

== Location of stores ==
As of March 2018, the company owns twenty stores, including thirteen in Hauts-de-France, five in Île-de-France and two in Belgium.

=== Shop on the Place de la Général-de-Gaulle in Lille ===
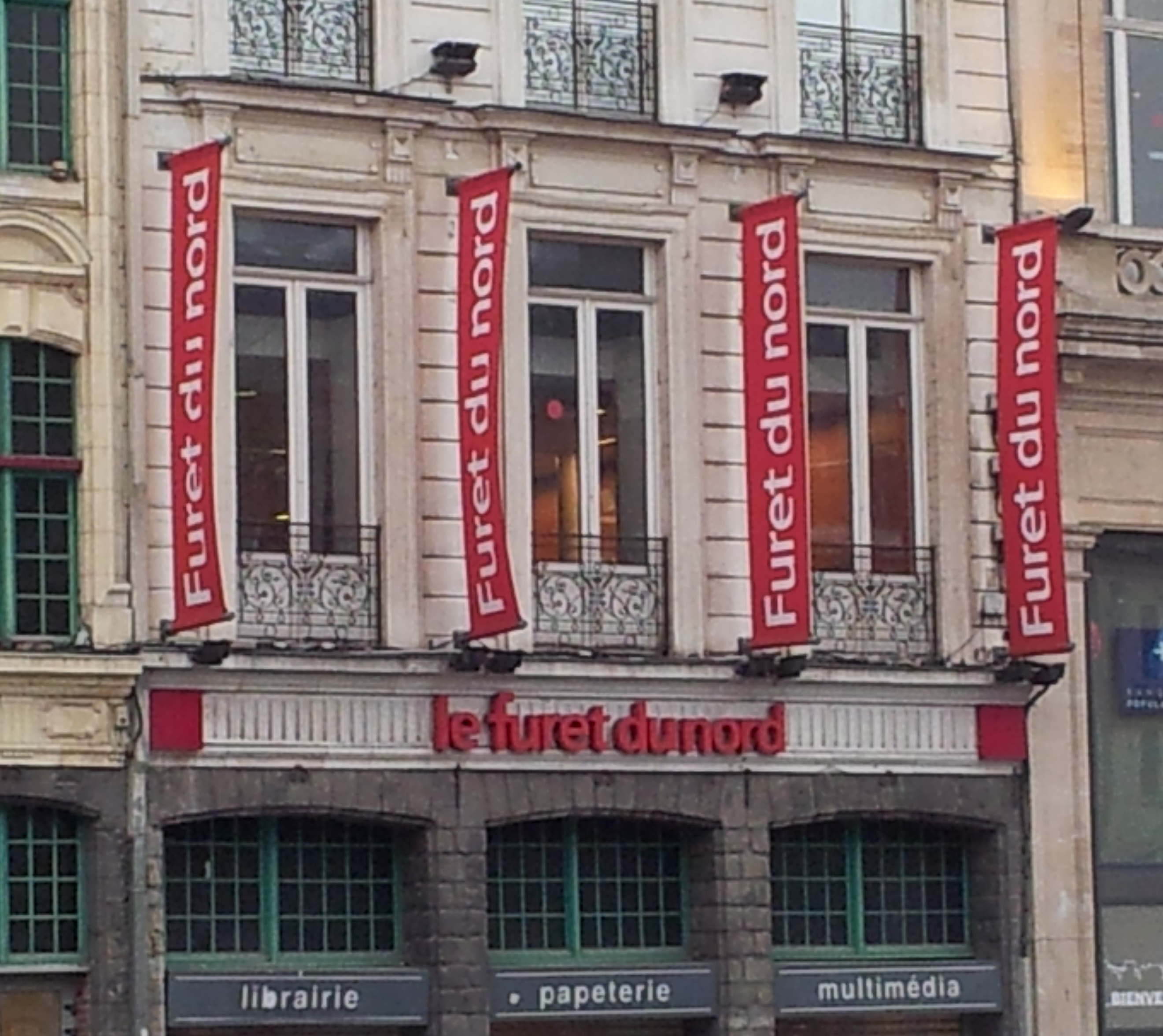
Furet du Nord on the Grand'Place, Lille

Since 1 August 1959, Furet du Nord has been located on the Place du Général-de-Gaulle, also called Grand'Place, in the city of Lille.

In 1969, the façade was modified to remove 19th-century additions in order to restore it to its original style of the 18th century. The façade is inspired by the painting of François Watteau, La Procession de Lille en 1789.

Over the years, the store has grown from 200 m^{2} to 8,000 m^{2}. When the company first moved to the Grand'Place at the location of Galeries Barbès, the sales area was 200 m^{2}. At the end of the year, it increased to 600 m^{2} when the old workshops of the Galeries Barbès were removed. At that time the Lille store occupied only the first floor. In 1976, Furet du Nord moved to the place of the Cinema Le Bellevue and expanded to 4,500 m^{2}, then in 1991 instead of the Hotel Strasbourg and passes to 8,000 m^{2}.

In 1974 and 1998, the store received 10,000 daily visits. It is serviced by the Rihour Metro station.

=== Open stores ===
City	Address	Opening year
Arcueil	La Vache Noire Shopping Centre	2011
Arras	Rue Gambetta	1989
Beauvais	Le Jeu de Paume Shopping Centre	2015
Béthune	Place Georges-Clemenceau	1992
Cambrai	Mail Saint Martin	1991
Coquelles	Cité Europe Shopping Centre	2011
Douai	Rue de la Mairie	2019
Dunkirk	Pôle Marine	2013
Englos	Boulevard du Commerce (Englos-les-Géants)	2010
Lens	Boulevard Basly	1986
Lieusaint	Carré Sénart Shopping Center	2013
Lille	Grand Place	1959
Louvain-la-Neuve	Place Agora	2018 (Acquisition)
Louvroil	Aushopping Val de Sambre Shopping Centre	2018
Montigny-le-Bretonneux	Sqy Ouest Shopping Centre	2017
Namur	Rue Émile Cuvelier	2018 (Acquisition)
Roubaix	Grand Rue	2005
Tremblay-en-France	Aéroville Shopping Centre	2013
Valenciennes	Rue du Quesnoy	1982
Villeneuve-d'Ascq	Boulevard Valmy (V2 Shopping Centre)	1991

=== Old stores ===
City	Address	Opening year	Closing year
Lille	Rue de la Vieille-Comédie	1936	1959
Boulogne-sur-Mer	Grand Rue	1990	2008
Douai	Rue de la Madeleine	1988	
Dunkirk	Place de la République	1994	2000
Le Kremlin-Bicêtre	Okabé Shopping Center, Avenue de Fontainebleau	2012	2016
Maubeuge	Avenue Jean-Mabuse	1983	2013
Tourcoing	Grand Rue	1984	
Saint-Quentin	Avenue de la Source de la Brièvre	1990	2008
