= Column of the Goddess =

1792 siege during the War of the First Coalition

- Colonne de la Déesse (French)
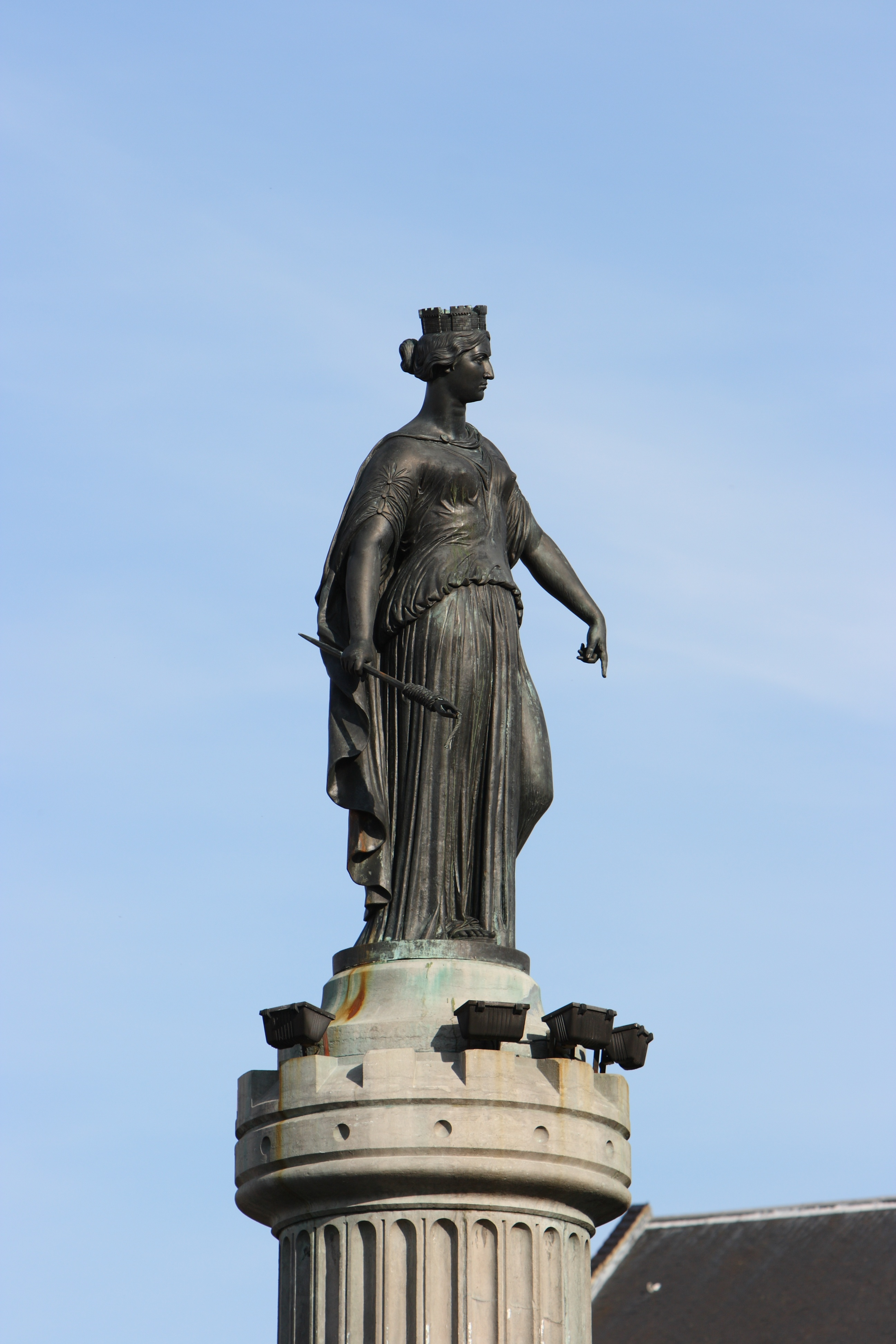
- Column of the Goddess, erected to commemorate Lille citizens' stand against the Austrian army
- Interactive map of Column of the Goddess
- 50°38′13″N 3°3′48″E
- Location: Lille, France

History
- Built for: Commemoration of the Siege of Lille (1792)

Site notes
- Architect: Charles Benvignat
- Architectural styles: Neoclassicism (Victory column)

The Column of the Goddess (French: Colonne de la Déesse) is the popular name given by the citizens of Lille, France, to the Memorial of the Siege of 1792. The memorial stands in the center of the city's Grand' Place (central square), and has been surrounded by a fountain since around 1990.

== The siege ==
The siege of September 1792 was one of the many battles fought during the French Revolutionary Wars and considered a major event in the city's history by its inhabitants, despite its relatively low military significance on a wider scale.

A few months earlier, in April 1792, French forces in the same area did not conduct themselves well – fleeing after a skirmish with Austrian forces and afterwards killing their own commander, Théobald Dillon. This might have made the Austrians expect an easy victory, which as it turned out was not the case.

An Austrian army of 20,000 men besieged the city of Lille. Then the city was attacked by Albert Casimir, Duke of Teschen. For nine days and nights, the Austrians bombarded the city without intermission, but had ultimately to raise the siege, faced with the determined resistance of the citizens, led by Mayor François André. The Austrians destroyed many houses and the main church (Saint-Etienne) of the city, which was on the Grand' Place (today the Place du Général-de-Gaulle). "The siege of Lille in 1792 was, from a purely military perspective, not a significant event. It is clear that contemporaries sought to exaggerate both the scale and the importance of the Austrian attack on Lille."

== The monument ==
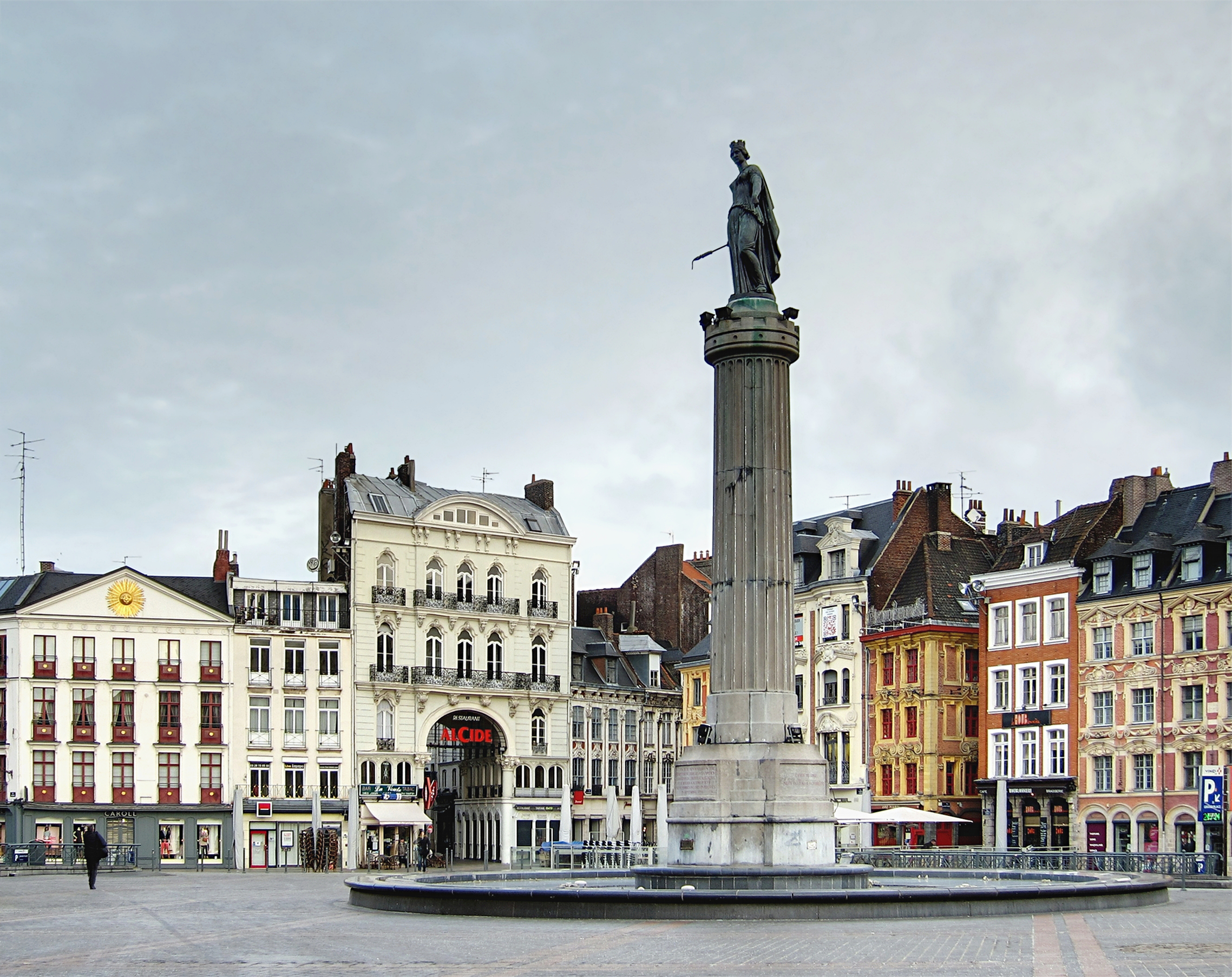
Column of the Goddess on the Grand' Place

The church was never to be re-built and the Grand' Place of Lille is still one of the few local central places without either a church or a belfry (unlike similar cities such as Bruges and Brussels).

Hyacinthe Jadin composed his Marche du siège de Lille in 1792, in the direct aftermath of the siege. For many years there was, however, no physical monument in the city itself. Some fifty years later, the local authorities became aware that nothing had been made to commemorate the 50th birthday of this event. They decided on the building of a memorial, just in time to lay the first stone in September 1842, but it was not before 1845 that the memorial was finished.

The memorial consists of a column topped by a statue. The column was designed by the architect Charles Benvignat, while the statue was sculpted by Théophile Bra as an allegory of the besieged city wearing a mural crown. It was nicknamed the Goddess by the inhabitants of Lille soon after the erection of the memorial, as some local poems suggest.

Preceded by Battle of Valmy	French Revolution: Revolutionary campaigns Column of the Goddess	Succeeded by Siege of Mainz (1792)
