= Vieille Bourse =

The Vieille Bourse (Old Stock Exchange) in Lille is the former building of the Lille Chamber of Commerce and Industry. It is located between the Place du Général-de-Gaulle and the Place du Théâtre and is considered to be one of the landmarks of the city centre. The building is in the form of a quadrangle, made up of 24 identical houses enclosing an inner courtyard, which serves as a meeting place for booksellers, florists, chess players and tourists.

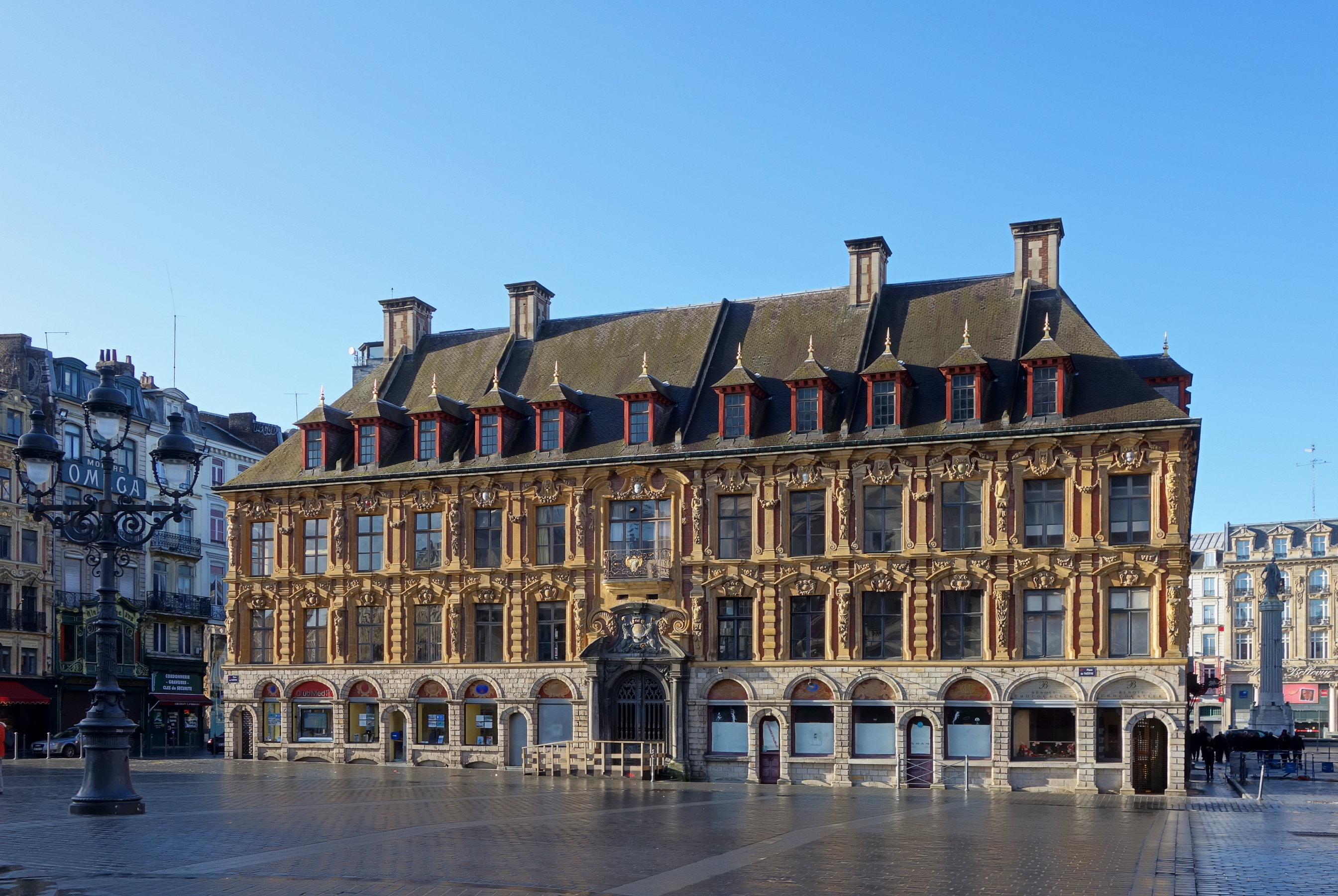
Lille vieille bourse

== History ==
Built in the middle of the 17th century when the city belonged to the Spanish Netherlands, the building was restored in the 19th century, and again from 1989 to 1998.

During the 19th century restoration, the coats of arms of the large regional companies were installed above the upper windows to commemorate their support.

The building was listed as a historic monument on 25 May 1921.

Vieille Bourse

=== 1651: Stock Exchange ===
In 1651 the City of Lille obtained from Philip IV of Spain the authorization to build "a bourse for the use of merchants that will be surrounded and encloses 24 houses".

The city sold the 24 slops of land around the market square to traders, and supported the construction of the galleries, paving the inner courtyard, and the four entryways.

The building was constructed between 1652 and 1653 under the direction of Julien Destrée, in order to offer to the merchants a majestic monument comparable to that of Antwerp.

The architecture is typical Flemish Renaissance of the 17th century.

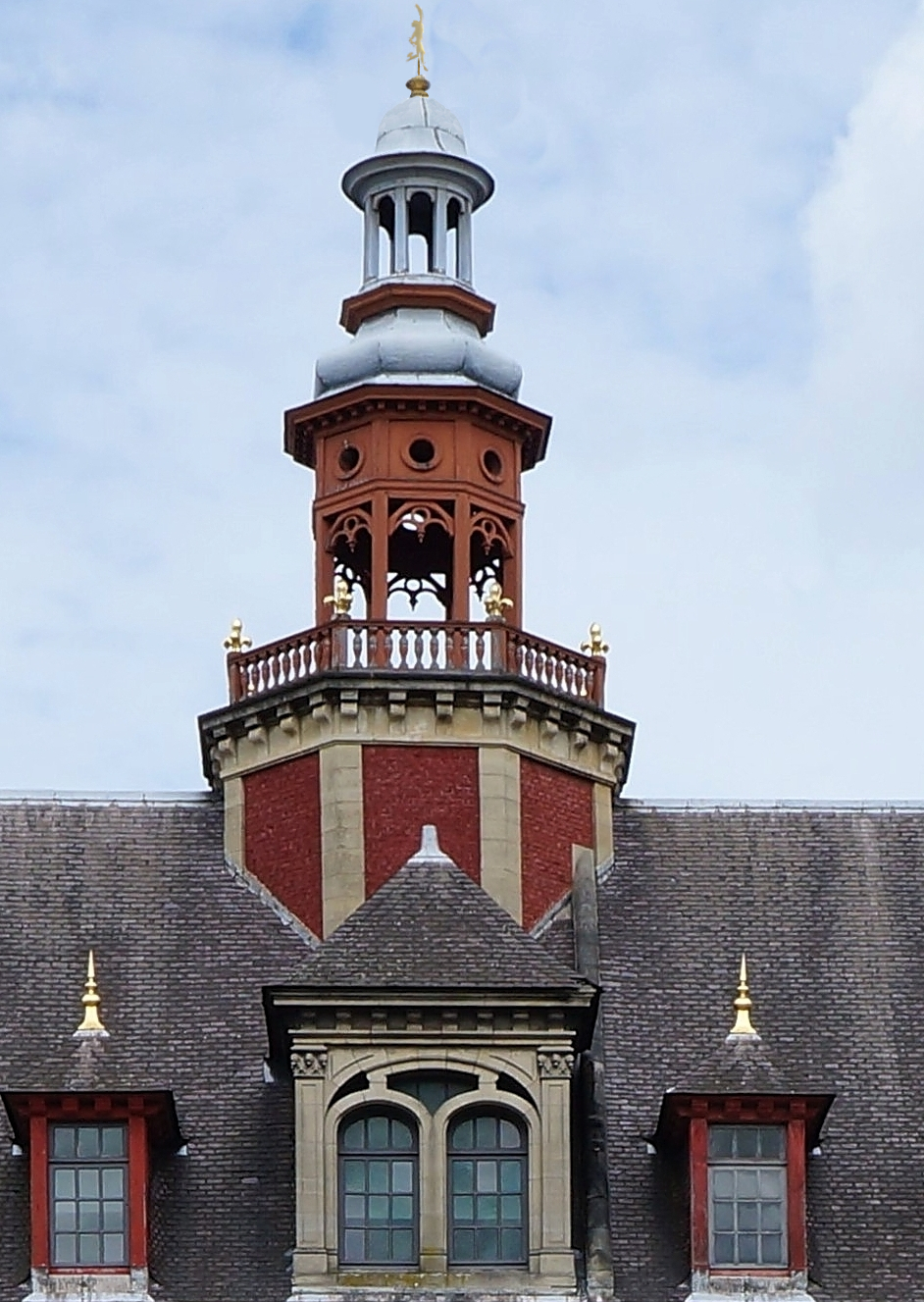
Lille Stock Exchange' campanile with the statue of Mercury

A statue of Mercury – god of commerce, and emblem of the Lille Stock Exchange – crowns the top of the campanile.

=== 1861: The year of the opening of a stock exchange ===
The Lille Stock Exchange opened in 1861 in the building. It was not a very liquid exchange: only 3.4% of the capital changed hands each year.

=== 1921: The inauguration of the new Stock Exchange ===
In 1921, the new stock change building (the Chamber of Commerce) opened, and the Vieille Bourse was vacated. It was classified as a historical monument the same year, and renamed to Vieille Bourse (Old Stock Exchange).
