= Charles Benvignat =

French architect

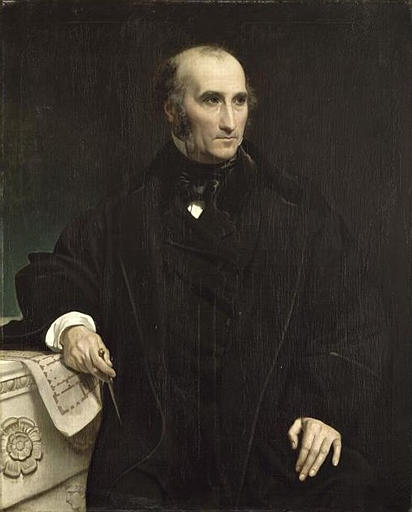
Charles Benvignat by Victor Mottez, 1859 (Musée des Beaux Arts de Lille)

Charles Benvignat (24 December 1805, Boulogne-sur-Mer, Pas-de-Calais – July 1877, Lille) was a French architect, especially active in Lille, then undergoing major urban expansion.

== Life ==
Benvignat moved to Lille as a young man. As a brilliant student in the architecture class at the Ecoles académiques, he was sent to the Beaux-Arts in Paris, where he studied as a painter as well as an architect. Returning to Lille, he was entrusted with several private projects and church restorations. In 1833 he was made the Ecoles académiques's professor of architecture and held the post for 30 years. From 1842 he was responsible for several major public works:

- Expansion of the old théâtre Lequeux (1842)
- Restoration of the Vieille Bourse and restoration of its decor (1842)
- Column of the Goddess, a 2-stage project located in the Place du Général-de-Gaulle, Lille (1845)
- Sugar and wheat hall (initial project now mutilated) (1848)
- Palais Rihour, base of the mayor and museums (1849)
- Lycée making up the medicine school and sciences faculty (1844–55)
- Several churches, such as in the Moulins and Esquermes suburbs

He died without issue in 1877 and his tomb was paid for by the town council of Lille.

== See also ==
- Tournai Cathedral
