= Leelh =

2010 massively multiplayer online role-playing browser game

- Developer: 3DDUO
- Platform: Microsoft Windows
- Release: June 10, 2010
- Genre: Massively multiplayer online role-playing game
- Mode: Multiplayer

Leelh is a post-apocalyptic massively multiplayer online role-playing browser game developed by the French game studio 3DDUO and released on June 10, 2010. The development was put on hold in November 2010, due to a lack of subscribers. 3DDUO eventually announced the closure of the game in December 2013.

== Plot ==
In the period leading up to the cataclysm, the highly unstable climate was causing the polar ice caps to melt, raising sea levels and engulfing cities and even entire archipelagos. The disappearance of many species of flora and fauna made oxygen scarce, while the air was already overloaded with toxins from pollution. The governments invested in cloning to replace livestock breeding and in chemicals to replace agriculture. Genetic manipulation was carried out on plants, animals, and even humans.

On April 20, 2060, a catastrophe struck the region: the power went out, cars and planes, now controlled by satellites, caused fatal accidents and many buildings collapsed. Since no humanitarian aid was forthcoming, it was assumed that these events took place on a planetary scale. Survival therefore became a necessity, while water became the most precious resource, replacing money.

The game took place in the ruined town of Villeneuve-d'Ascq, in the Nord-Pas-de-Calais region of France, from 2087 onwards.

=== Universe ===
Various mutations transformed plants (which colonized the entire region) and animals (which became bloodthirsty monsters). Men were also somewhat affected, giving rise to 4 ethnic groups.

The Inputs were the most severely affected: having become speechless and bestial, they developed a new society among themselves, of which cannibalism is the keystone. At first, this practice was merely an extreme solution in response to intense famine, but it later developed, expanded, and became ritualized. Extremely powerful and dangerous, they attacked survivors without killing them, and herd them into pens where they were fattened before being dismembered and eaten alive.

The Marche-Peur have been less affected by mutation, but have lost their ability to speak and their human behavior. They have gathered in packs, keeping their distance, and have set up very precise territories for themselves: they only attack if a survivor enters.

The Turnes were the least affected, but the effects of the mutations are still visible: their irises have become discolored, and the whites of their eyes have darkened to shades of gray. Apart from this detail, they could be considered normal humans. They were welcomed by the doctor named Vico, near the Nashen outpost.

The Emnus have not been affected by the mutations, and were considered “survivors”, rather like in the film I Am Legend. They were therefore considered normal humans. They were welcomed by the doctor named Steto, near the Founders' outpost.

The two outposts were controlled by two opposing factions Nashen and Founders, each of which was made up of parts of both ethnic groups, fighting to the death for control of the region. There were also some neutrals.

== Gameplay ==
Leelh was played directly on a web browser. Originally, the game required a paid subscription: this business model was abandoned and replaced by a sponsorship system. You could personalize your character and choose a body type (Midoche, Sec, Mastoc, Colosse), each of which had advantages and disadvantages, as well as special abilities. Role-playing and player-versus-player systems were integrated. A non-compulsory tutorial was available to ensure that new players were not dropped into the game without the basics.

The game's interface included: ethnicity, faction membership, gauges (health, nutrition, calm, breath), chat channels, experience bar, command and action buttons, day counter (each day lasts 22 hours) with a day/night cycle, cartouche indicating the area where the character is located, and round status dots.

Progression in the game was achieved in different ways: gathering experience (by scavenging, questing, or fighting) in order to level up and earn points to be distributed among different skills (such as learning to identify food or to wield a sword) or having your character survive over time, each day of survival bringing a few points to be distributed among different talents (such as the ability to eat toxic food or the chance to succeed in actions). Making your character known to the factions by performing the tasks in one of the outposts would increase the reputation and unlock new quests and actions, as well as accessing places that are normally locked. If the character was knocked out and not relieved in time, he was sent to a doctor and lost all his talents.

== Development and release ==
In 2008, 3DDUO decided to create a massively multiplayer online game that could be played directly on the browser. The idea was to recreate Lille in a post-apocalyptic setting with a comic book-style rendering. All the financing came from the company's own revenues, an investment fund, and a grant from the Nord-Pas-de-Calais Regional Council. The project was a success in the test versions, where the servers were at one moment overloaded beyond capacity. In 2009, the studios produced a lip dub to promote the game and the company, and went to the Fête de l'Animation in Lille to test the Alpha Version.

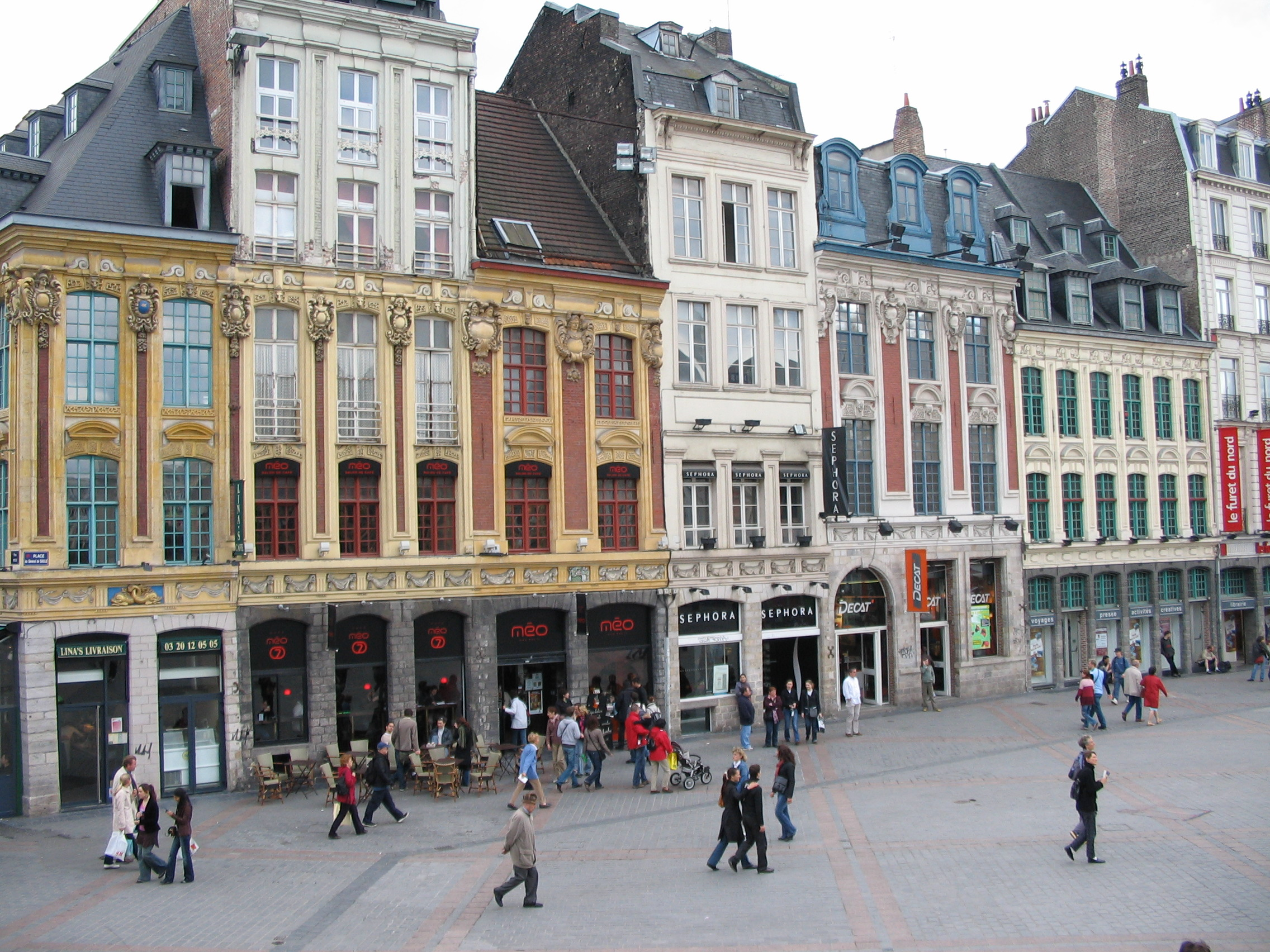
Lille's Grand'Place, with Furet du Nord on the right.

Following studio visits in 2010 to Galeries Lafayette in Lille, Polytech Lille, and the Salon de la Bande Dessinée et du Graphisme in Roubaix, Version 1.0 was released on June 10, 2010. Three months earlier, Frédéric Mitterrand, Minister of Culture under the Fillon III government, had paid an official visit to the studios, just as the Beta version had been released. Shortly afterwards, the studios launched a mini-game on the Facebook social network to attract players. The game's success was such that the opening of a second server and the addition of the cities of Lille and Paris to the game were envisaged, while the introduction of a subscription system was announced.

3DDUO and the community interacted on a regular basis: for example, there were many national meetings between developers and players. These players were also sometimes called upon by the studios: for example, they were allowed to create their own T-shirt, the best of which would be integrated into the game, for the United Colors of Leelh competitions (based on the Benetton concept), and to vote for the game in the online games JOL d'Or competition organized by JeuxOnLine.

At the end of 2010, things took a turn for the worse: without enough players, and therefore money from subscriptions, the project was in danger of turning into a big financial loss. Facing difficulties in attracting a sufficient number of players, 3DDUO decided to put the game on hold in November 2010.

On October 14, 2013, 3DDUO announced the game's two-stage closure, following too many problems caused by a community that had become too unstable. The game’s closure took place on December 31, 2013, coinciding with the planned shutdown of the website.

== Reception and awards ==
Leelh was nominated for the Prix de la création française award at the Festival du jeu vidéo 2010. The game received a rating of 10/20 from Jeuxvideo.com.

== Planned prequel ==
In April 2011, 3DDUO presented the concept of their new project Reehborn at the International Audiovisual Content Market, which was selected for an “Online & Social Game” award.

On September 14, 2012, the developers launched a website that contained an 18-day countdown, eventually leading to a formal announcement of Reehborn on October 2. It was specified that Leelh would continue to run in parallel and that Reehborn would be its prequel, as a multiplatform game (browser, smartphones, and Facebook app), but the official release date remained unknown.

Reehborn's focus was on survival with 3 distinct phases, the aim being to survive waves of hostile creatures by building a shelter, while uncovering the secret of the cataclysm that had struck the Earth. At the same time, the financing method was made public: a call for donations, via the Ulule platform, was made to players. Players had a month and a half to donate the €25,000 required for the project, with tiered rewards to motivate them.

On October 10, 2012, the first teaser was unveiled. The campaign came to an end at just 15% of its goal, not providing the desired funding.
