= Cité Europe =

Shopping centre

Coordinates: 50°56′2.4″N 1°48′32.6″E

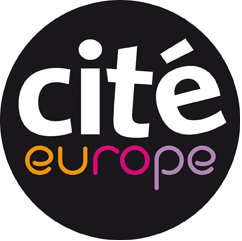
Logo of the mall

Cité Europe is a shopping centre located next to the French terminal of the Channel Tunnel at Coquelles.

Inaugurated on 21 March 1995, approximately 10 months after the Tunnel opened, Cité Europe has over 140 shops, a hypermarket, a 12-screen cinema complex and around twenty restaurants.

Designed by architect Paul Andreu, it is intended to echo the design of the Tunnel. It is easily accessible by public transport, and has free parking for more than 4000 cars.
