= Julien Destrée =

French master cabinet-maker and architect

Julien Destrée (or Destrez) was a 17th-century French master cabinet-maker and architect.

== Biography ==
Julien Destrée was registered as a bourgeois from Lille in 1634 and was a furniture manufacturer, master surveyor and master builder of the town from 1642 to 1677. It is in this capacity and on the order of the magistrate of Lille that he led the construction of the vieille Bourse whose work took place in 1652–1653. He was then the author of many achievements among which the rang de Beauregard and several Lille houses from the second half of the century. Julien Destrée (or Destrez) as a master escriver also created a statue of Saint-Roch and a lectern for the church of S. Vaast d'Hallennes-lez-Haubourdin. The statue of Saint-Roch is in painted and gilded wood of 0,78 m height and of 0,40 m width. It is Inscribed in the "inventaire général des Monuments et des Recherches Artistiques de la France" (Fiche de pré-inventaire N° 11017. Immeuble par destination et objet mobilier; Ministère des Affaires culturelles. Place of storage: église Saint-Vaast – Hallennes-lez-Haubourdin. Property: the commune (Sources: (Belgique, Namur, arch. de l’Etat, FC 4321) - Le Patrimoine religieux hallennois by Michel Leconte, local historian (of Hallennes) - Work deposited in the diocesan archives of Lille). As for the desk, the inventories of 1905 do not mention it and those of the revolutionary period have not been preserved (Sources: A.D. N. de Lille). So we don't know what happened to it.
