= Rue Esquermoise =

Street in Lille, France

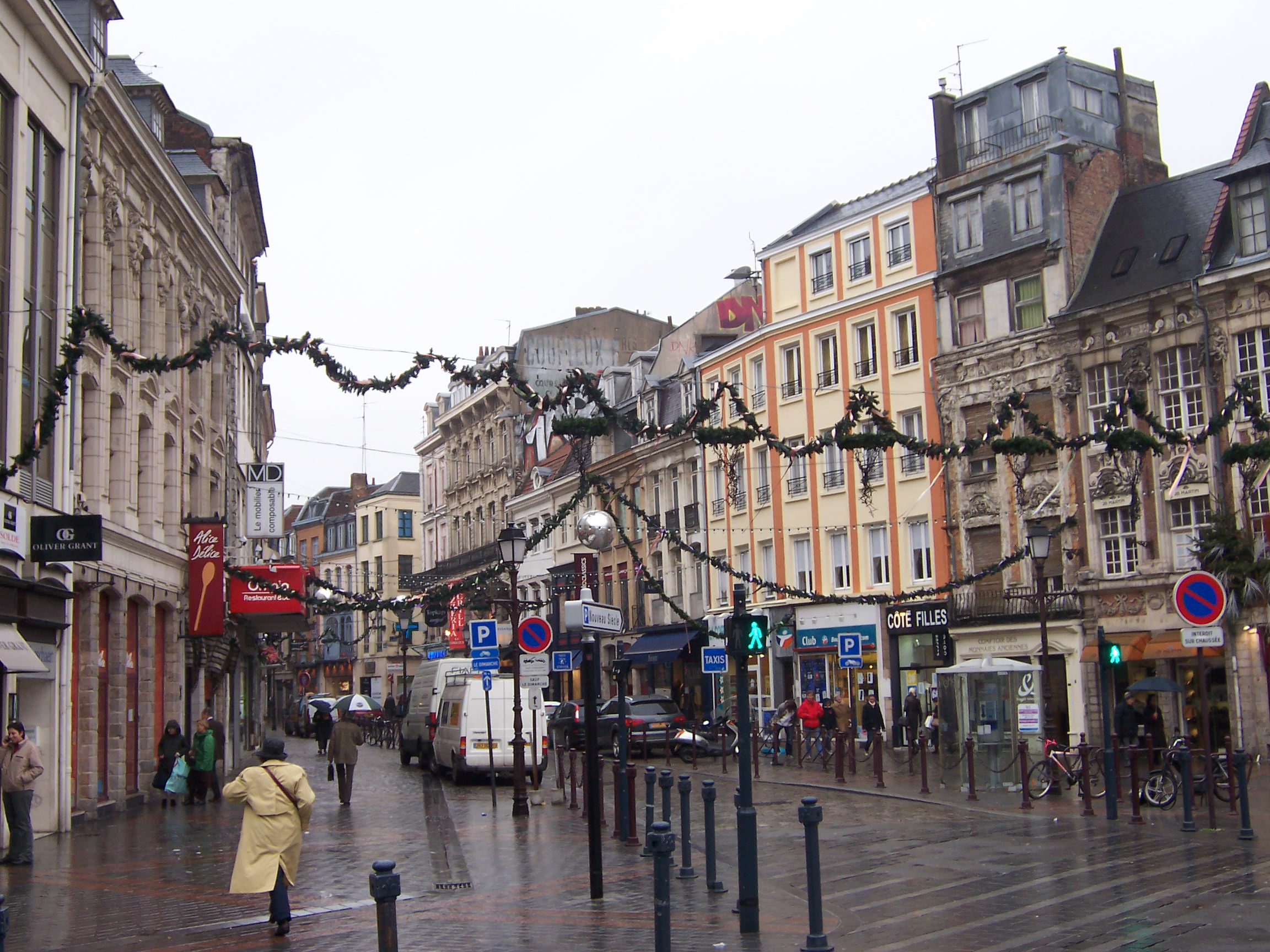
- Rue Esquermoise seen from Place du Général-de-Gaulle.
- Interactive map of Rue Esquermoise
- Type: Street
- Area: Hauts-de-France
- Location: Lille
- Coordinates: 50°38′17″N 3°03′41″W

Rue Esquermoise (French pronunciation: [ʁy ɛskɛʁmwaz]) is a street in Lille.

== Location and access ==
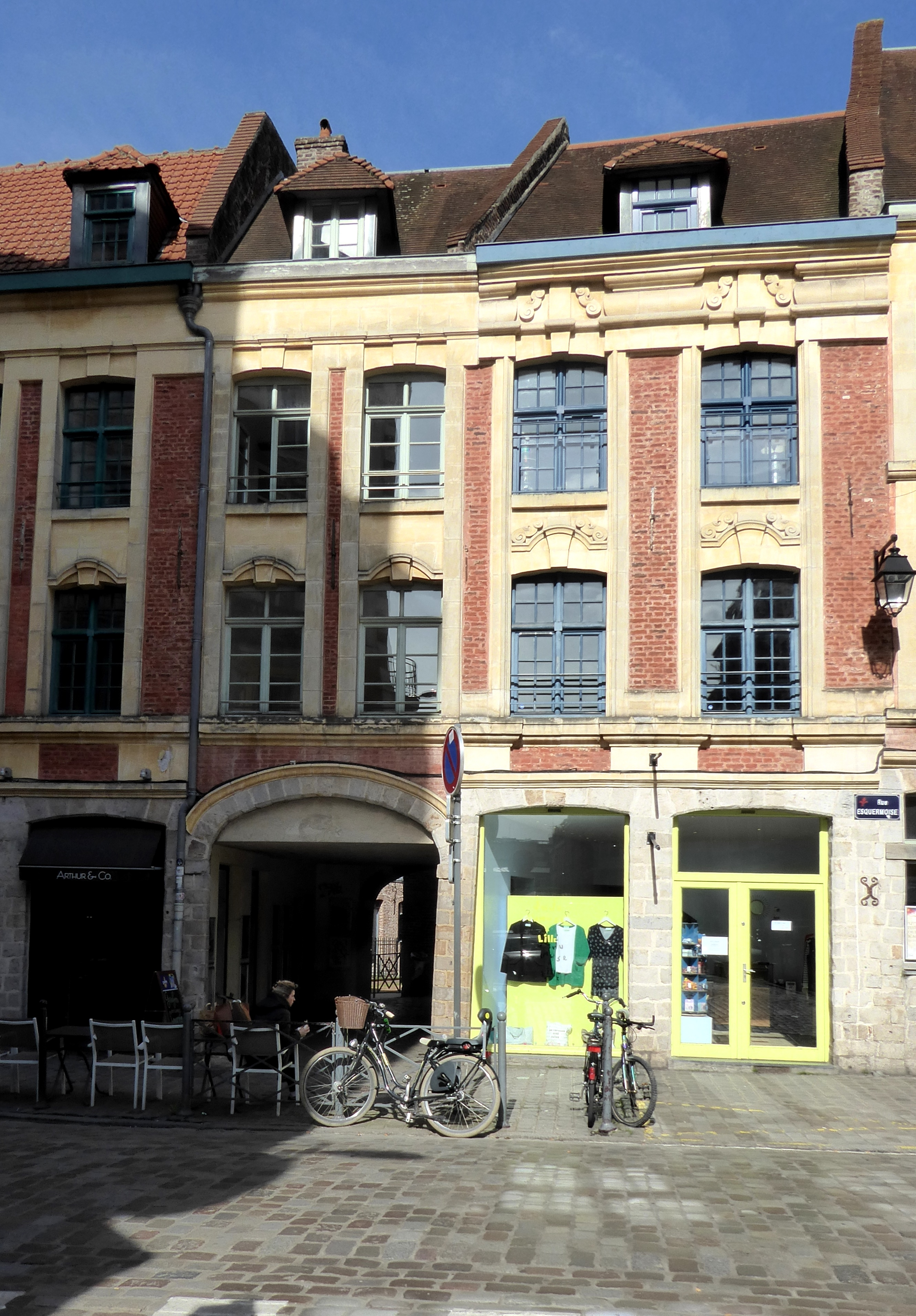
Passage to rue de Weppes

Located in the Lille-Centre district, it links Place du Général-de-Gaulle with Rue Royale and Rue de la Barre. From Place du Général de Gaulle, Rue Esquermoise crosses, on the left, the rue Saint-Etienne pedestrian street, on the right rue des Débris Saint-Etienne, named after the former church of Saint-Etienne, destroyed during the siege of Lille in 1792, on the left rue des Poissonceaux, named after the former Poissonceaux canal, covered over in 1877, parallel to the street to the south, on the right rue Basse, on the left rue Thiers, on the right rue Jean-Jacques Rousseau, the former refuge street of Loos Abbey.

It continues into Rue de la Barre to the southwest (the start of the old route de Dunkerque) and Rue Royale, one of the main thoroughfares in the district created when Vauban enlarged the town in 1670.

A passageway opened after 2005 on the first floor of a house facing Rue Thiers allows pedestrians and cyclists to reach the Parvis de la Treille via rue de Weppes, established on the site of the canal of the Pont de Weppes, which was covered over in 1933.

== Name origin ==
It takes its name from its route, which led to the former commune of Esquermes.

== History ==
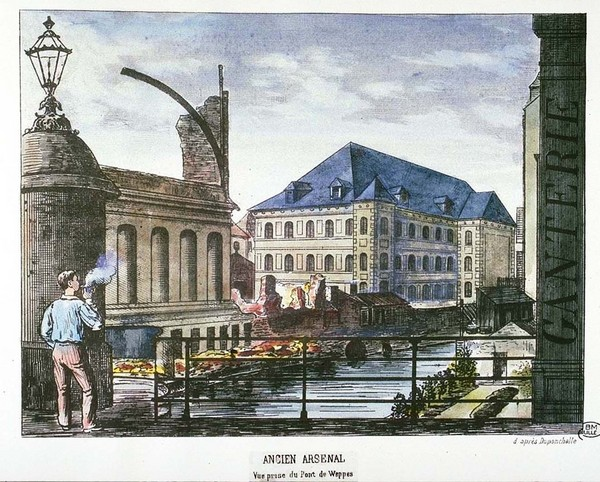
View of the canal from the Weppes bridge in the mid-19th century.

Rue Esquermoise is one of Lille's oldest streets.

It joined the Place du Marché (today's Grand'Place) to the future Route de Dunkerque (today's Rue de la Barre).

It ran towards the village of Esquermes (formerly a parish, then annexed by the city of Lille in 1858), from which it took its name.

Between today's rue des Poissonceaux and rue Thiers, from the 14th century until its demolition in 1801, stood the façade of the Hôtel de la Poterne, seat of Lille's chambre des Comptes and later finance office.

Until the canal de la Baignerie was covered by rue Thiers in 1878 and the canal du Pont de Weppes in 1933, the street crossed this inland waterway via the Pont de Weppes, which was located at the junction with rue Thiers. Houses dating from the 17th and 18th centuries were built on the north side, blocking the view of the canal (now rue de Weppes). The other side of the bridge (towards today's rue Thiers) was undeveloped.

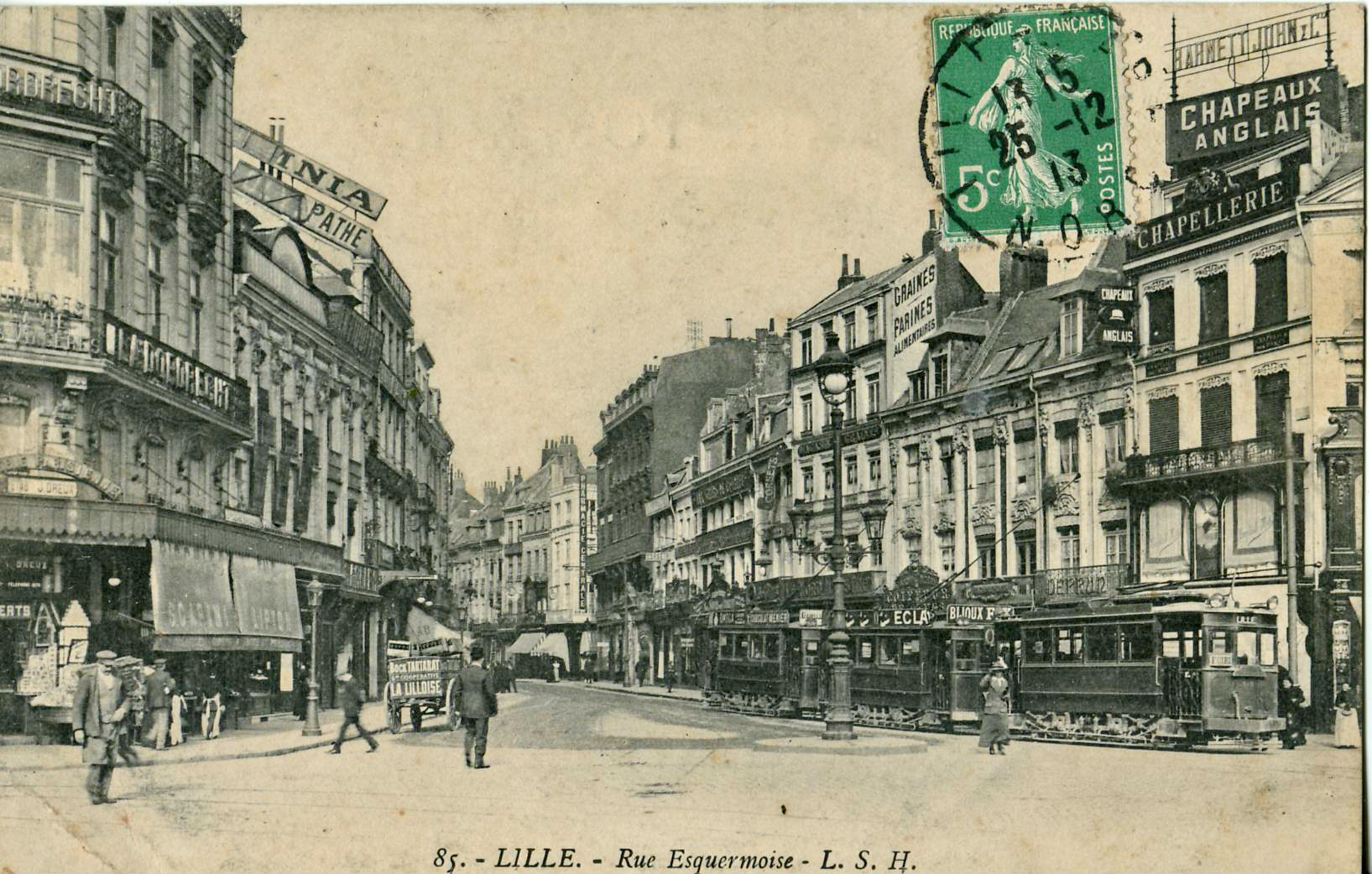
The street in the 1910s, with 3 parked tramcars.

The Porte de Weppes was located near this bridge (now at the corner of Rue Esquermoise and Rue Thiers) on Lille's second city wall of the 11th century.

The end of rue Esquermoise, from the corner with today's rue Thiers to rue de la Barre, was therefore located outside the city until Lille was extended to include rue de la Barre and the faubourg de Weppes, and the ramparts were extended as far as the Porte de Barre. This extension probably dates from the 13th century.

== Remarkable buildings and places of remembrance ==
Five building lots are listed as historic monuments in Lille. The buildings located at nos. 4, 6, 8 and nos. 5, 7, 34 and 36 have had their roofs and street facades listed as historic monuments since March 13, 1944.

No. 5 also has the first building's sign depicting the hen inscribed. No. 15 has the carved stone Maisoncelle sign embedded in the façade, listed since March 15, 1944.

Maison Méert, located at no. 27, has been listed as a historic monument since August 5, 1980. The front of the patisserie, founded in 1761, was designed by Lille architect Charles Benvignat and dates from 1839.

The Ravet-Anceau directories had their headquarters at no. 52.

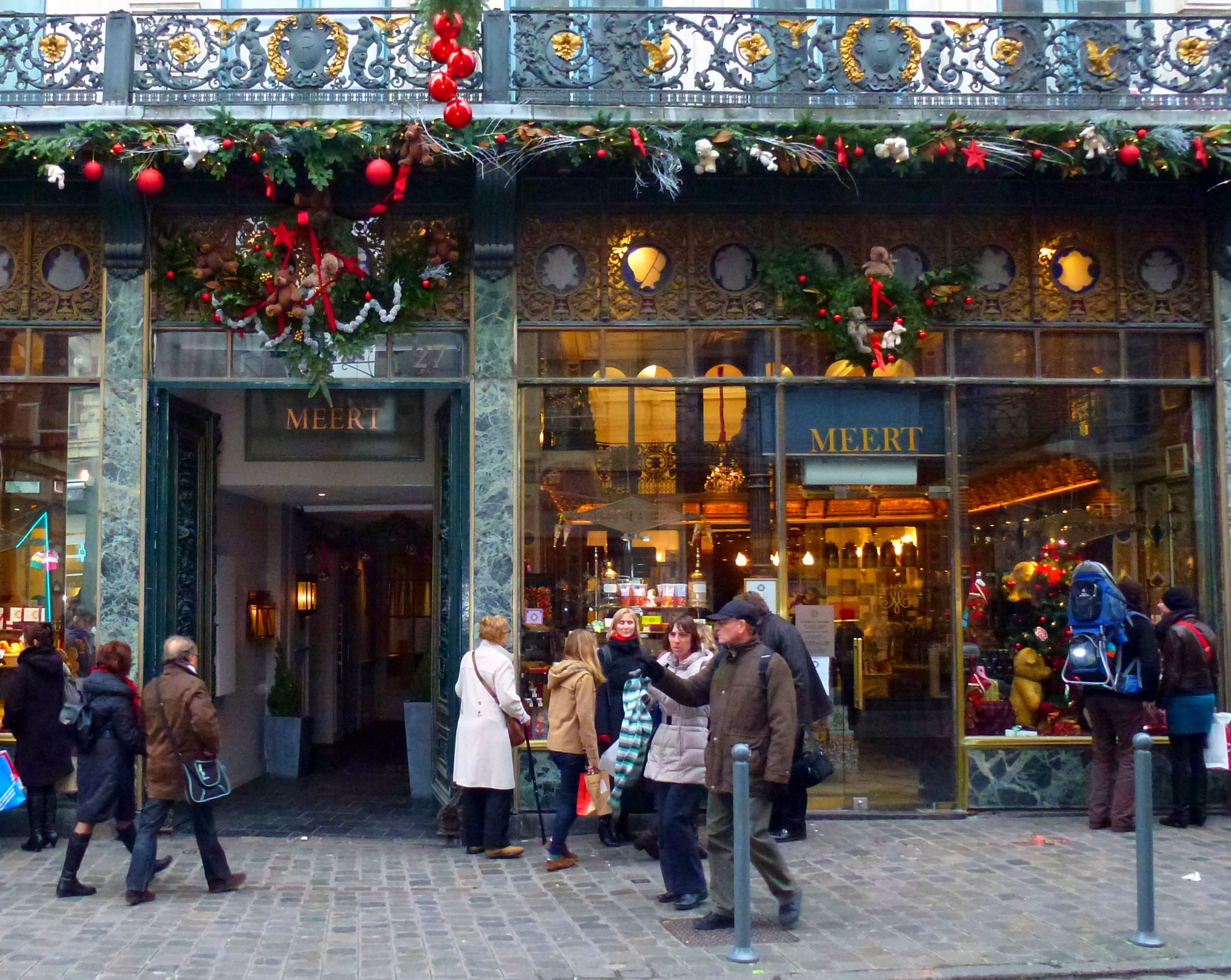
La maison Méert

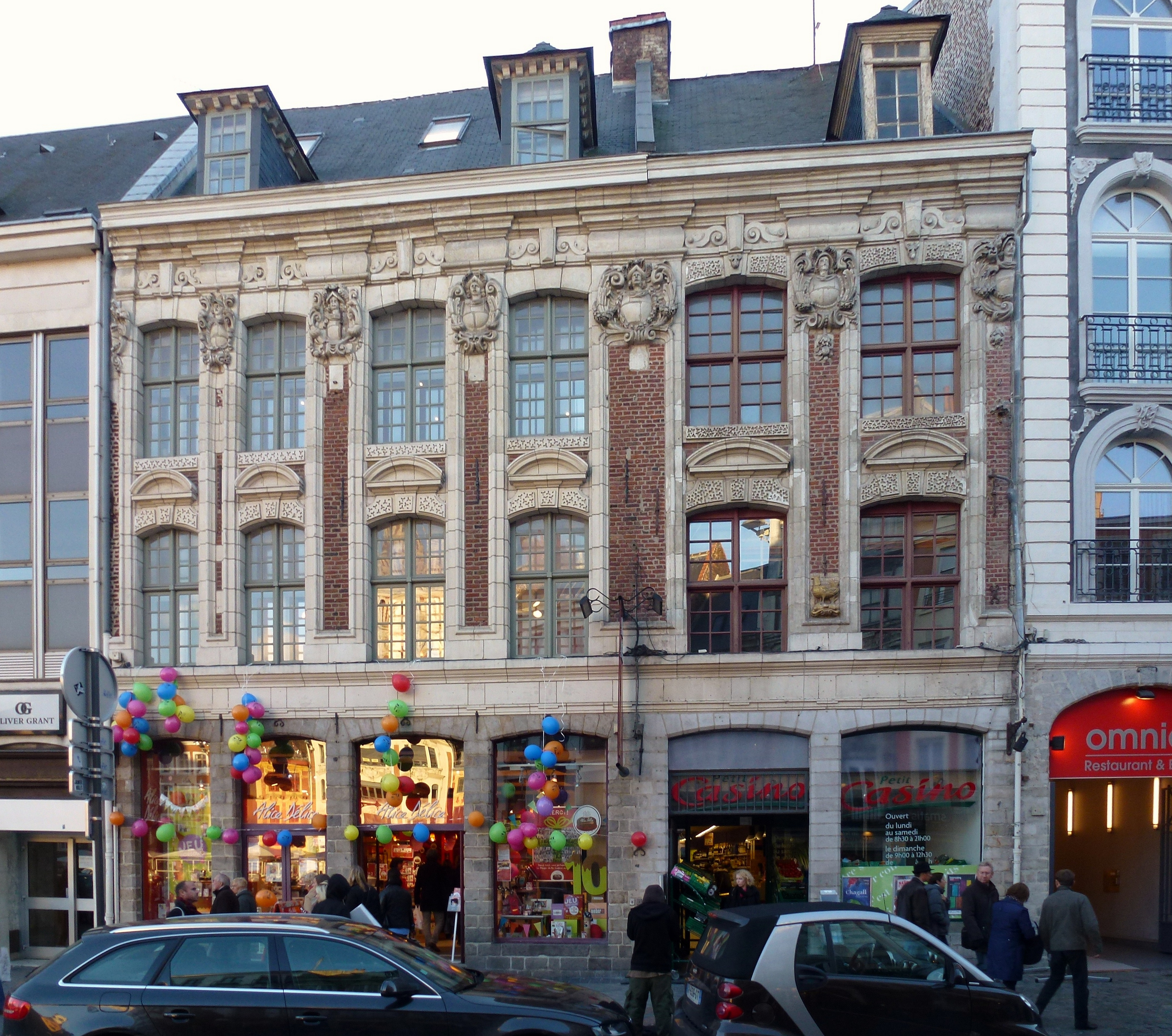
5, 7

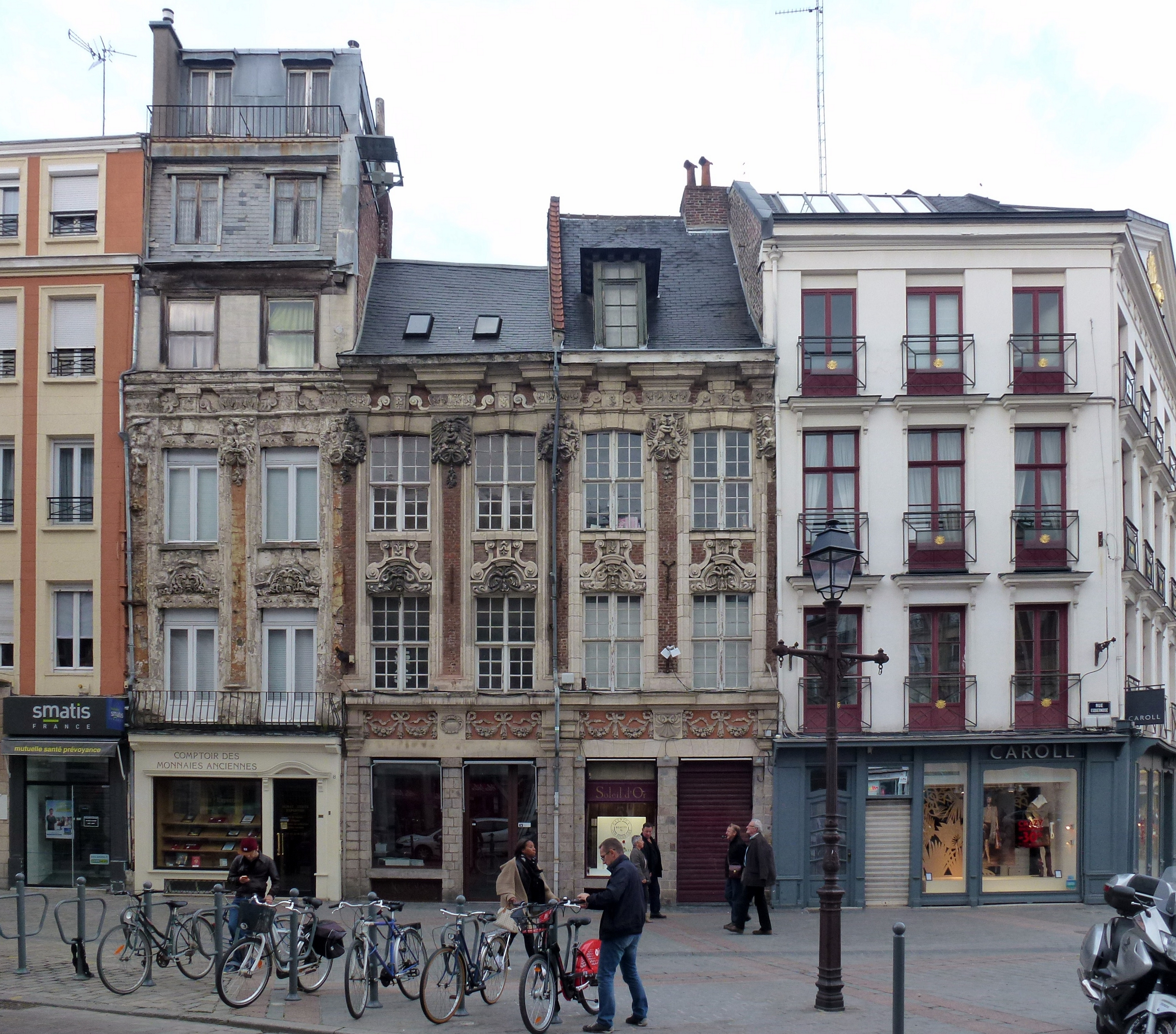
4, 6, 8 rue Esquermoise

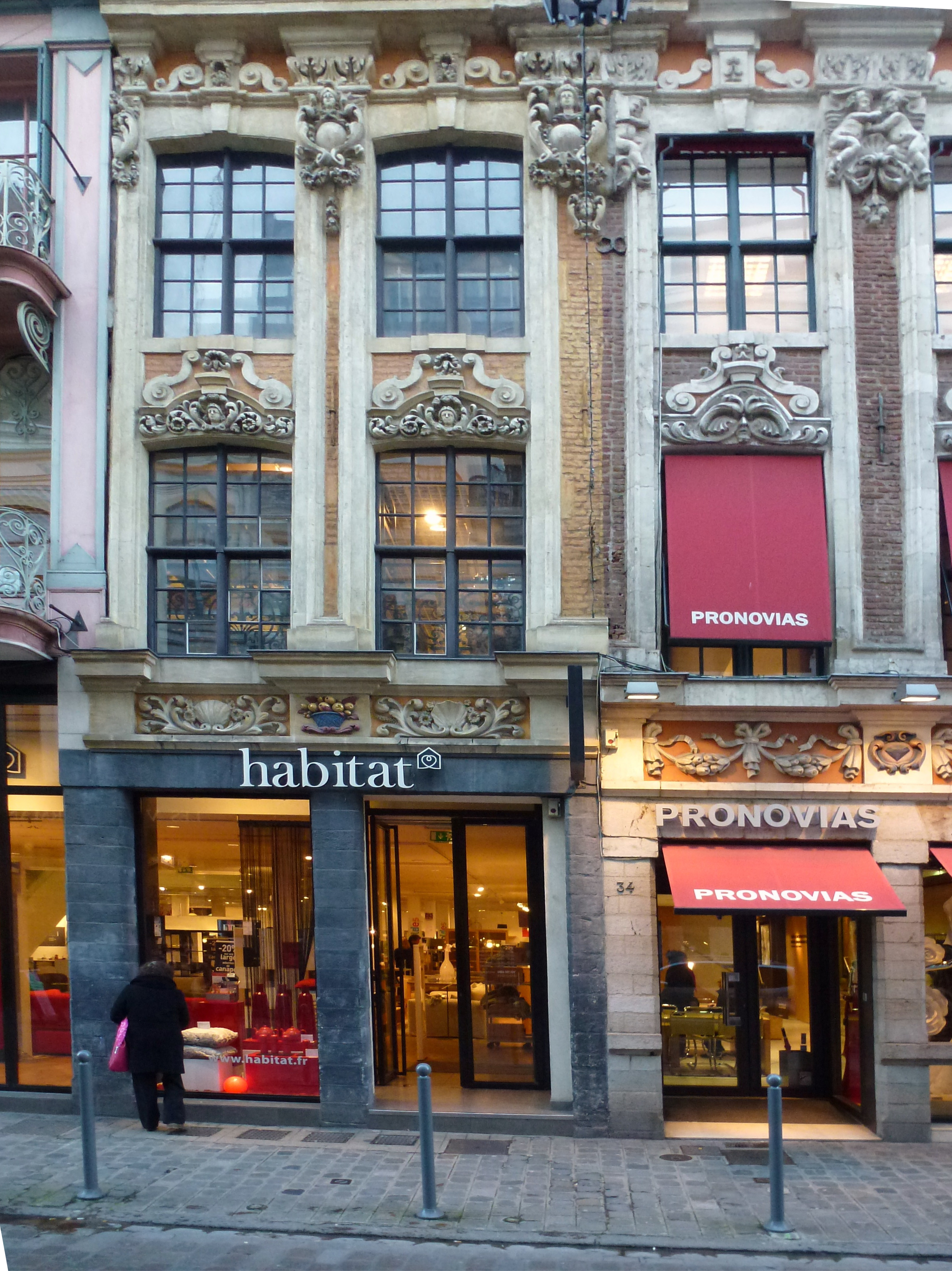
32-36 rue Esquermoise

== See also ==
- Lille
- List of twin towns and sister cities in France
- Place du Général-de-Gaulle (Lille)
- Collegiate Church of Saint-Pierre
- Vieux-Lille
- Lille 3000
