= Vieux-Lille =

District in the north of Lille, France

- Quartier
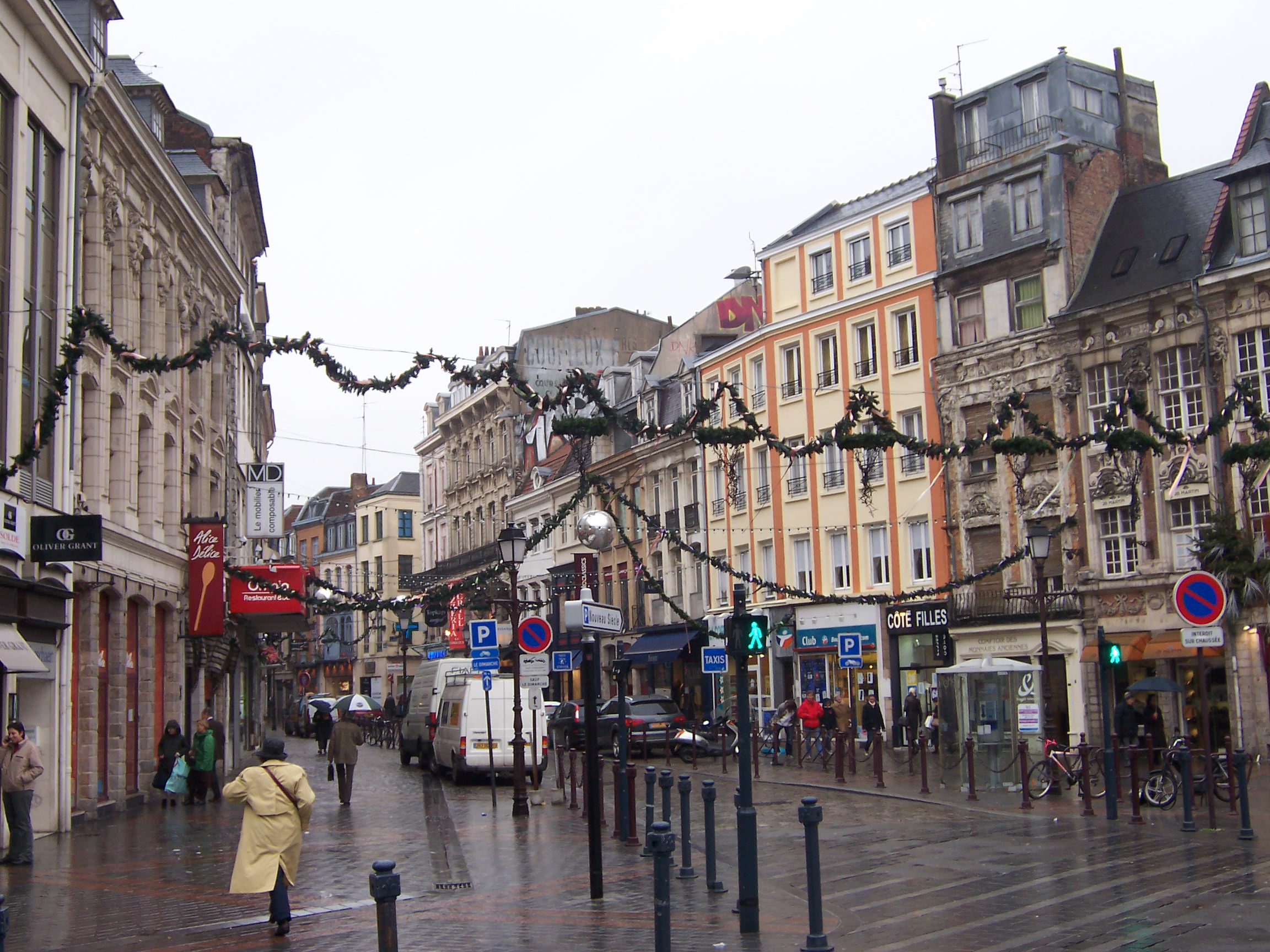
- Entrance to Vieux-Lille via rue Esquermoise

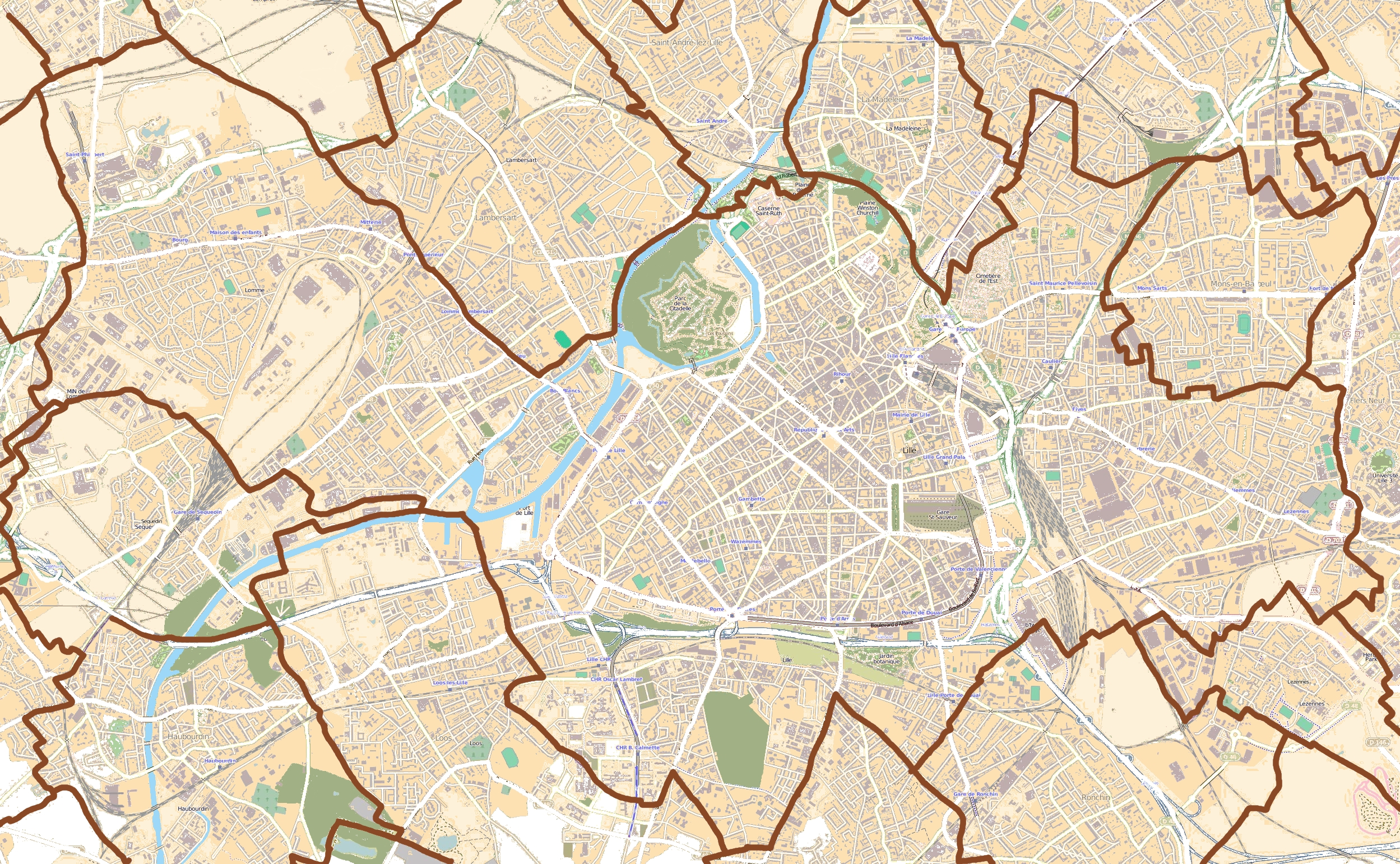
- Coordinates: 50°38′36″N 3°03′38″W

Vieux-Lille (Old Lille) is a district in the north of Lille. It is the district with the most pre-19th-century buildings. It still boasts many cobbled streets and traces of the canals that crisscrossed the city in centuries gone by. It is home to 20,000 inhabitants.

== General ==
Until the First World War, Vieux-Lille was the name given to the part of the city that predated the 1858 expansion, i.e., the area bordered to the west by Boulevard de la Liberté and to the south by Boulevard Louis XIV. During the First World War, the area around Rue de Béthune, the railway station, and Rue du Molinel was destroyed, and the Palais Rihour (18th-19th centuries) burned down. The destroyed areas were rebuilt in the style of the 1930s: Art Deco around rue du Molinel, neo-regionalist on rue Faidherbe and rue de Béthune.

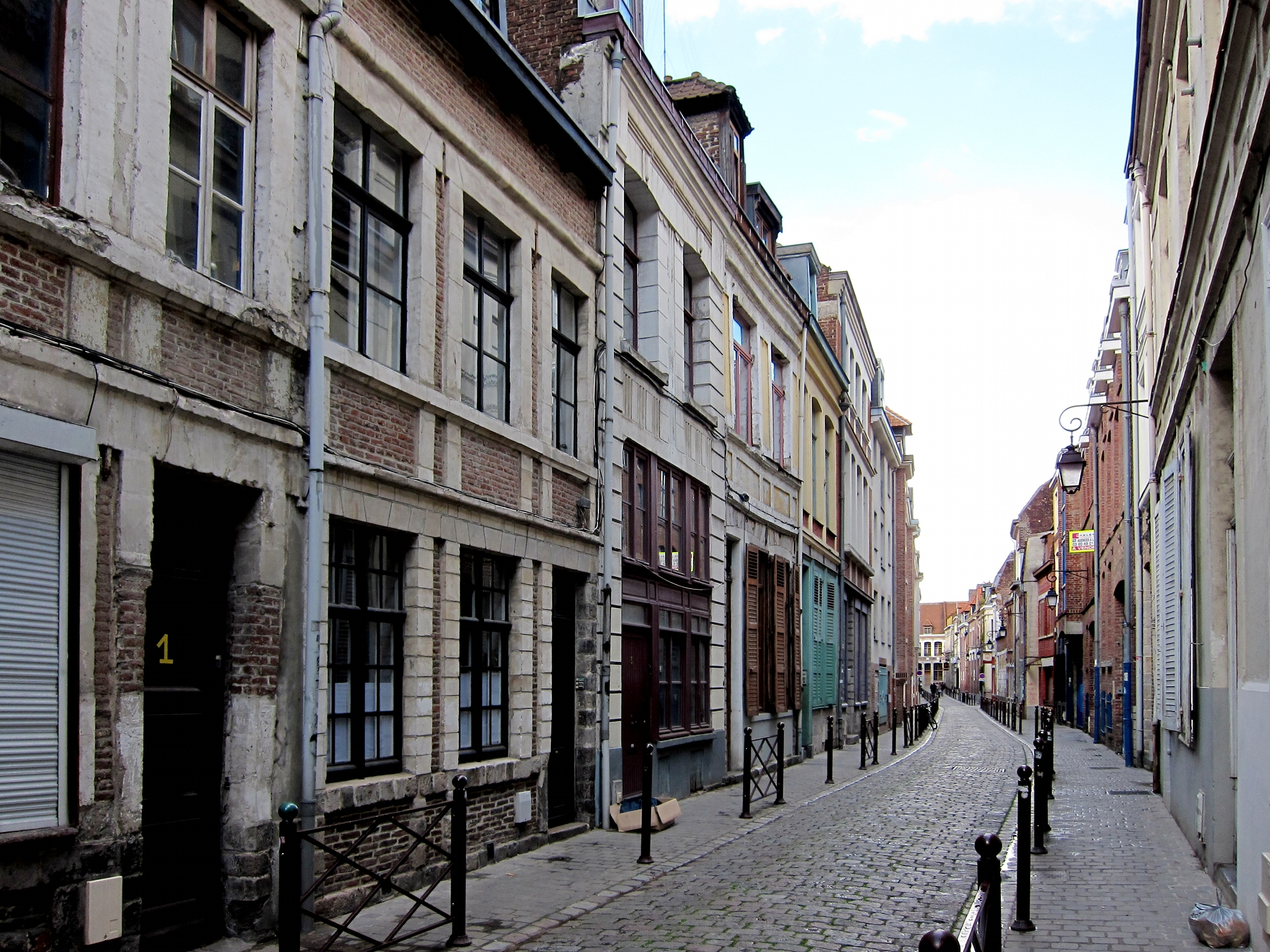
Rue Doudin, in the formerly popular part of Vieux-Lille

In the 1960s and 1970s, the destruction of the working-class Saint-Sauveur district left Vieux-Lille as the last remaining example of the city's pre-industrial architecture.

At the time, the northern part of the city center was the only old part of Lille that had been completely “preserved”. Escaping modernization, it was neglected until the 1980s by the more affluent residents, particularly in the area around Place aux Oignons. It's probably from this period that the name “Vieux-Lille” (Old Lille) has shifted to this area alone. A neighborhood of immigrants and impoverished large families, with a bad reputation until the 1980s, escaped a project to build an expressway through its center. Instead, it was restored under the successive mandates of Pierre Mauroy, and today has become a very dynamic commercial district. It's home to many bars, restaurants, and several stores, including luxury boutiques. Since its restoration, property prices have risen steadily, renewing the population almost entirely and leading to rapid gentrification.

Place Louise-de-Bettignies

Although Lille's origins date back to the 11th century in Vieux-Lille, in the area around the Notre-Dame de la Treille cathedral built on the ancient motte castrale, the “castrum” around Place aux Oignons and as far as the former Basse Deûle, now avenue du Peuple-Belge, the “forum” in the triangle between rue Basse, rue Esquermoise and rue Grande-Chaussée, (Note: Description in the Charter of endowment by Baudouin V to the collegiate church of Saint-Pierre, dated 1066.) most of what we call “Vieux-Lille” today is not the oldest part of the city.

The former faubourg de Weppes around the church of Sainte-Catherine, which lies roughly between the rue Léonard-Danel, the rue d'Angleterre to the north, the rue des Trois-Mollettes to the west, the rue de Weppes, the rue Thiers, the rue de la Baignerie to the southwest, the quai du Wault and the square du Ramponneau, was incorporated into the town by an extension of the city walls around 1370, becoming the fifth parish within the city walls, after the parishes of Saint-Pierre, Saint-Étienne, Saint-Maurice, and Saint-Sauveur.

The grounds of the former Château de Courtrai and its outskirts included in Lille's 1619-1622 enlargement (the area between Avenue du Peuple Belge, Rue du Pont-Neuf, Porte de Gand, and Boulevard Carnot) are also part of Vieux-Lille.

The part of Vieux-Lille to the north of rue du Pont-Neuf and rue Négrier (Note: Named after General François de Négrier, Governor of Lille.) dates back to the 1670 enlargement decided by Vauban after Louis XIV annexed the city to France. The streets in this part of the district, the parish of Saint-André, and the former parish of Sainte-Marie-Madeleine are characterized by their linear layout and regular plan. Most of these streets are lined with French-style buildings dating from the late 17th and 18th centuries, including numerous townhouses inspired by those built simultaneously in Paris.

On the other hand, the looser streets at the junction of Vieux-Lille and the city center, and around the cathedral, are some of Lille's oldest: rue de la Clef, rue de la Grande-Chaussée, rue des Chats-Bossus, place aux Oignons, rue Basse, and more.

After the disappearance of almost all medieval buildings (wooden houses), these streets are lined with buildings dating from the 17th and 18th centuries, rows of Flemish Renaissance-style houses from the 17th century, identical in proportions and rhythms but differing in decorative details, They are lined with rows of houses in the XVIIth-century Flemish Renaissance style, identical in proportions and rhythms but differing in the details of the decorations, XVIIth-century arcaded houses in the Lille style, or XVIIIth-century classical houses in the Lille style, and include few buildings from later periods, thus preserving the town's XVIIIth-century appearance.

== Notable buildings ==
Rue des trois Mollettes

Vieux-Lille is especially rich in rows of houses, mansions, and imposing buildings, over a thousand years of history.

=== Buildings of civil origin ===
- the Vieille Bourse and the Lille Chamber of Commerce.
- the Lille Conservatory.
- la Halle aux sucres: originally a warehouse for sugar and grain, its transport was facilitated by the proximity of the Basse-Deûle and its canal on Avenue du Peuple Belge.
- Hôtel de Wambrechies: located on rue Royale, this 18th-century French-style hotel was built in 1703. It was first used as the Hôtel de l'Intendance, then as the Prefecture from 1826 to 1872 (59 to 68 rue Royale). It has been the seat of the bishopric of Lille since 1913.
- Hôtel Crépy-Saint-Léger, so named because it was acquired in 1899 by Monsieur Crépy-Saint-Léger (77 rue Royale), and Hôtel d'Hespel, built in 1896 by E. Meurillon for the bankrupt Count d'Hespel (75 rue Royale), both belong to the Banque de France.
- Hôtel Notre-Dame: just opposite the Hospice Comtesse, its main entrance is on the Notre-Dame-de-la-Treille cathedral side. Marie-Caroline de La Grandville-Beauffort had it built around 1860, and dedicated it to youth work. The current occupant is the Maison de l'Apostolat des Laïcs.
- The Hôtel du Juge Garde des Monnaies, a preserved part of the former mint, closed around 1850 and destroyed. The Maison de l'Apostolat des Laïcs was built on this site.
- Birthplace of Charles de Gaulle Museum: Charles de Gaulle's birthplace is located at 9 rue Princesse. To perpetuate his memory, it became a museum and reopened in 2005 with new exhibition rooms and a multimedia space on the life and work of Charles de Gaulle. Among the exhibits is the room where little Charles was born on November 22, 1890, with portraits and period furniture.
- Hospice général: Located northeast of Avenue du Peuple-Belge, the Hospice général was built in the 18th century to supplement the ever-growing activity of the Hospice Comtesse. A superb sun, a symbol of the Sun King, decorates the building's frontispiece. In 1996, the Institut d'administration des entreprises (IAE) moved in.
- The Masonic Temple on rue Thiers, designed by architect Albert Baert, a member of the Lumière du Nord lodge and inaugurated on July 5, 1914. Inside and out, the temple is designed in a style reminiscent of “Egyptian Orientalism”, in vogue in the 19th century. Although the building itself is called a “temple”, it contains two Freemasonic temples stricto sensu. As historic monuments, they are sometimes open to the public during Heritage Days. The façade of the temple is surmounted by a bas-relief depicting a sphinx, a pyramid, a sun, and a woman holding a mirror.

=== Religious buildings ===
- Notre-Dame de la Treille cathedral-basilica.
- l'église Saint-André (1701–1758): former chapel of the Carmes, where General de Gaulle was baptized.
- the Couvent des Minimes: located on the Quai du Wault, it became the Alliance Golden Tulip Hotel in 1988, following its purchase by Charles Kindt. It was then renovated, including a cloister and a 2,500 m^{2} inner courtyard. The Minimes founded this Flemish-style convent in 1619; it was disused, during the French Revolution in 1791, and for a long time housed the intendance of the armies.
- The Urbanist Convent: In the first half of the 17th century, a community of cloistered nuns settled here. They were a minor branch of the Order of Poor Clares, and so founded this convent. Today, it houses the Musée des Canonniers.
- The Franciscan convent (rue d'Angleterre), now a student residence, whose chapel has been preserved.
- Sainte-Catherine church (16th - 17th centuries): hallekerque.
- Sainte-Marie-Madeleine church (1667. Architect François Vollant): central-plan church with circular choir in Flemish Renaissance style.
- Hospice Comtesse: Founded in 1237 by Countess Jeanne, this is a fine example of architecture from the time of the Counts of Flanders. The nuns cared for the sick here (cf. salle des malades). After the French Revolution, it became a hospice for the elderly. It also housed an orphanage until 1939. After two fires, the Hospice Comtesse was rebuilt and restored, and today's buildings date from the 15th, 17th, and 18th centuries. Since 1969, it has housed a museum. The earthenware-tiled kitchen, dining room, furniture, objets d'art and portraits recreate the atmosphere of a 16th-century Flemish home. The museum also features Flemish and Northern French paintings, tapestries by Guillaume Werniers, and goldsmiths from Lille. Exhibitions are held regularly.

=== Buildings of military origin ===
- Citadel of Lille, known as the “Queen of Citadels”.
- Porte de Gand.

=== Canals ===
The memory of the presence of rivers (through which the Deûle flowed through the town before being diverted to the north) is remarkable:

- The Avenue du Peuple-Belge was the site of the Basse-Deûle port, where water flowed until 1933.
- The Pont-Neuf, still in existence today (although its arches have disappeared), crossed the Basse-Deûle river
- the Quai du Wault
- the dry canals around Notre-Dame de la Treille cathedral, Canal Saint-Pierre, and Canal du Cirque, marked by ditches in front of the cellars of neighboring houses.
- The canal du pont de Weppes under the rue de Weppes.
- the canal de la Baignerie or canal du pont de l'Arc under rue Thiers and beyond to quai du Wault.
- the canal des Poissonceaux, which ran under rue Jean-Roisin, rue de Pas and joined the canal de la Baignerie at rue Thiers, near rue de la Chambre des comptes.

== Important extinct buildings ==
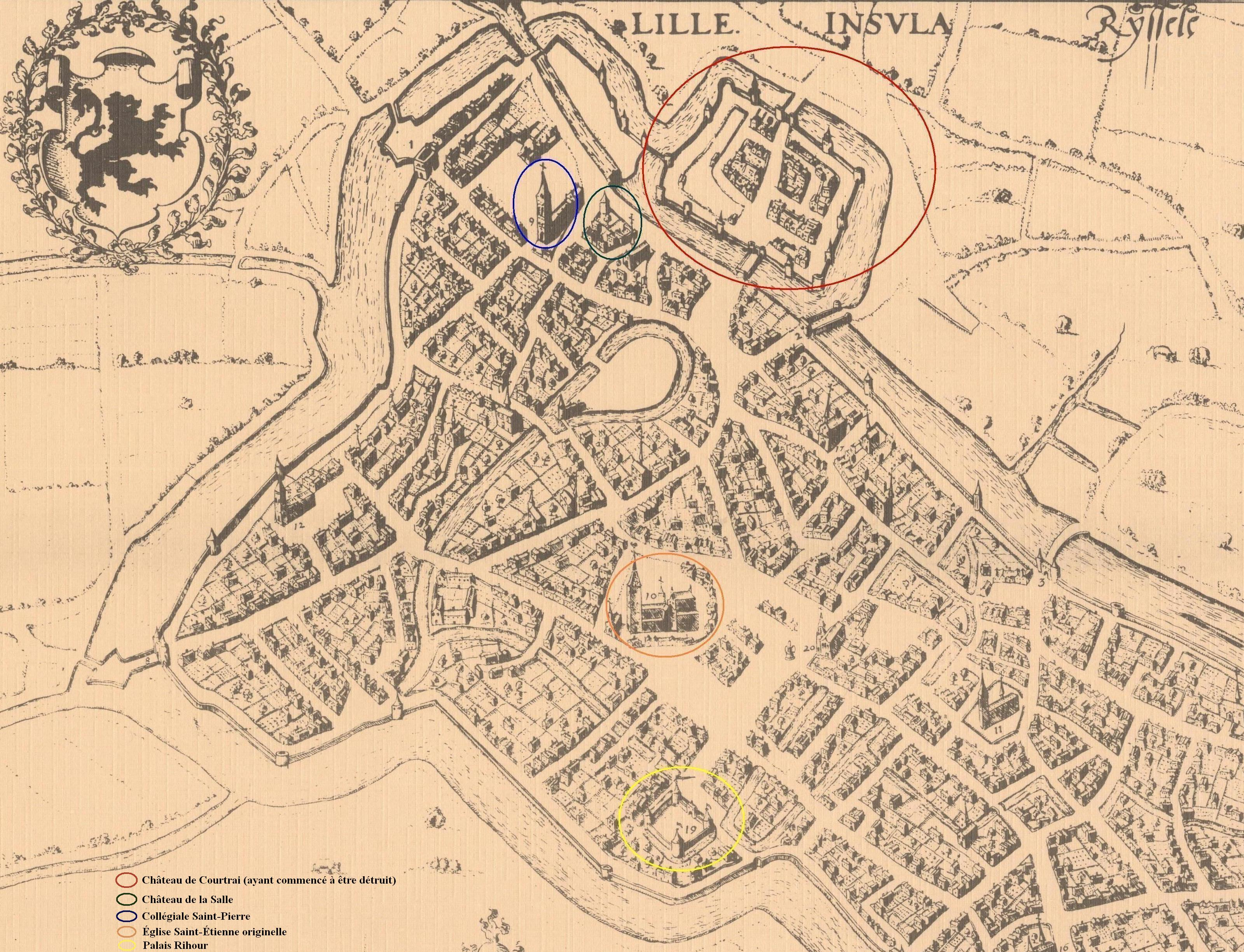
Lille in 1580, with the positions of the buildings that no longer exist: the Château de Courtrai (red), the Château de la Salle (green), the Collegiate Church of Saint-Pierre (blue), the first Church of Saint-Étienne (orange) and the Palais Rihour (yellow). The rounded empty space corresponds to the medieval motte and thus to the current site of Notre-Dame-de-la-Treille cathedral.

are buildings that have left their mark on the history and people of Vieux-Lille, making them part of the district's historical and cultural heritage.

- the Château de Courtrai. In 1298, the King of France, Philippe le Bel, had the Château de Courtrai built a few months after his victorious siege of Lille, which until then had belonged to the Count of Flanders, Gui de Dampierre. This massive edifice had multiple objectives, including being a necessary place to watch over the city and house a garrison (albeit numerically weak), being a point in the fortifications prone to bringing in the king's troops in the event of rebellion by the city and, finally, being a stronghold directly oriented towards the general direction from which the majority of Flemish attacks would probably come. From 1305 to 1369 (the period of French occupation), its castellans were the successive garrison captains paid by the King of France. Lille had already become fully Flemish again in 1369, thanks to its Burgundian princes, and its new lord was Philippe le Bon, who preferred to build himself a more refined residence, better suited to emerging etiquette and an expanding court, the Palais Rihour. However, the château retained its military functions until the arrival of Philip II of Spain. As Lille's population grew, the Habsburg emperor authorized the castle's demolition in 1577, and the land was included in the city's 1617-1622 expansion and incorporated into the new fortified enclosure built at that time. Rue de Gand, originally Rue de la Madeleine, runs along the castle's main thoroughfare to the Porte de Gand.
- Collégiale Saint-Pierre.
- Saint-Étienne church: renovated in the 15th century, this was the original Saint-Étienne church, different from the one on rue de l'hôpital militaire. This former church was the Immaculate Conception Church of the former Jesuit College, which became the de facto parish church of the Saint-Étienne parish. The former Saint-Etienne church was destroyed by cannonballs during the siege of 1792.
- Château de la Salle. On the orders of Charles V, who wished to “free up” some of Lille's surface area, it was destroyed in 1515, prompting the governor to move to the Palais Rihour.
- Hôtel de la Poterne, home to the Chambre des Comptes, on the corner of rue Esquermoise and rue Thiers.

== See also ==
- Lille
- Rue Esquermoise
- Citadel of Lille
- Place du Général-de-Gaulle (Lille)
- Collegiate Church of Saint-Pierre

== Bibliography ==
- Duquennoy, Antoine (2005). Vieux-Lille: 1975, Lille. Édition de l'Étagère. ISBN 2-9524689-0-7.
- Rossez, Patrice (2005). Lille-Centre, Vieux-Lille: Mémoire en images. Alan Sutton.
