= Collegiate Church of Saint-Pierre (Lille) =

Collegiate Church that no longer exists

Collegiate Church of Saint-Pierre, Lille
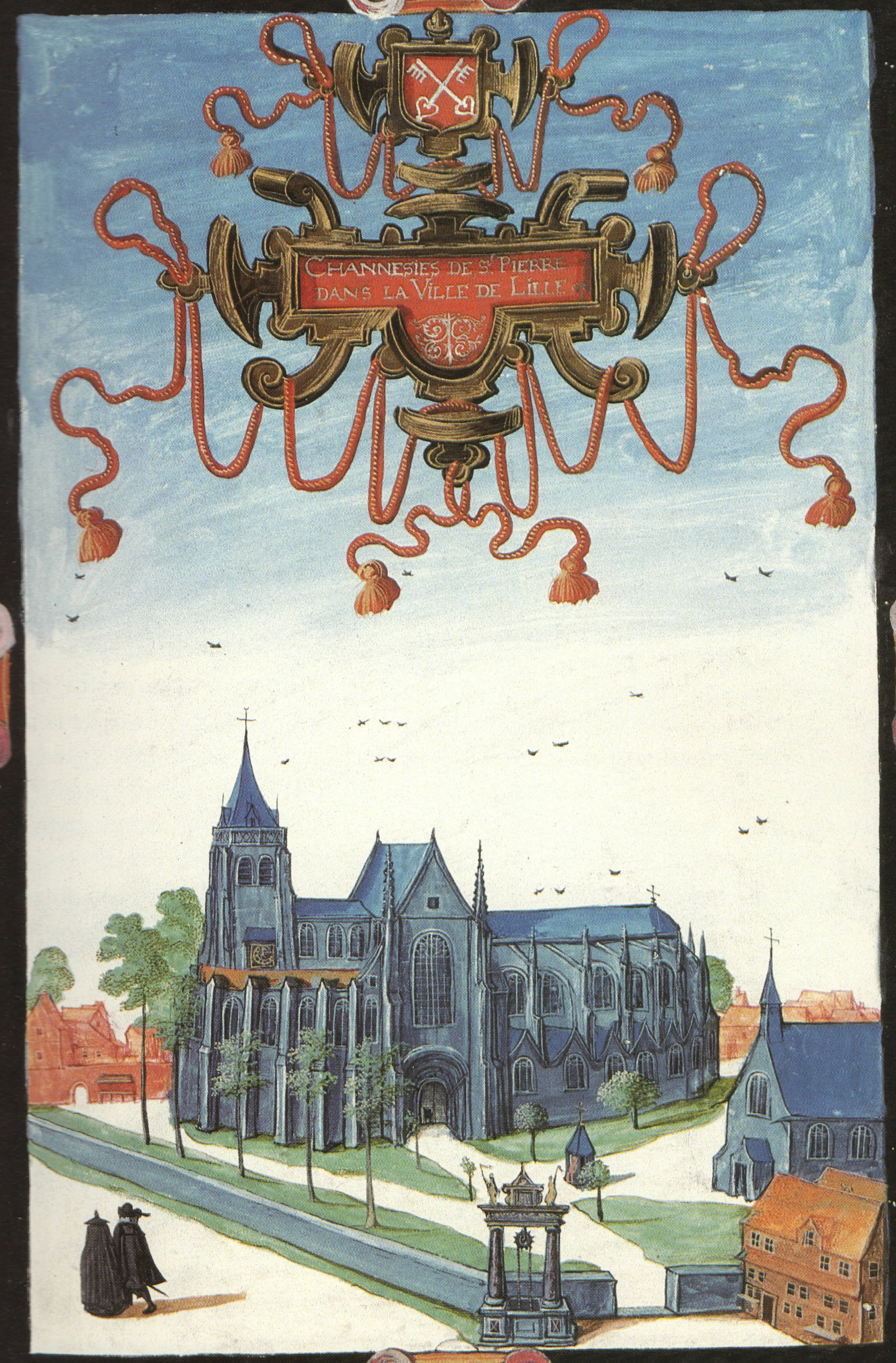

Religion
- Affiliation: Catholic church
- District: Vieux-Lille
- Region: Hauts-de-France

Location
- Location: Lille
- Country: France
- Interactive map of Collegiate Church of Saint-Pierre, Lille
- Coordinates: 50°38′31″N 3°03′44″E

Architecture
- Type: Gothic
- Established: 12th century
- Completed: 17th century
- Demolished: 1794
- Attached to the Diocese of Cambrai (in the 18th century) Monument historique

The Collegiate Church of Saint-Pierre (French: Collégiale Saint-Pierre) was once a large church located in Vieux-Lille, and for almost 750 years it set the pace for Lille's religious life. Seriously damaged during the Austrian siege of 1792, its destruction began in 1794. Its crypt, the only remaining vestige, was listed as a historic monument in 1971.

== Location ==
The collegiate church stood on the site of today's Palais de Justice.

== History ==
=== The beginnings ===
The first mention of this collegiate church dates back to an endowment charter dated 1066, which provides information on the châtellenie of the time. Under this charter, Count Baldwin V of Flanders granted the collegiate a quarter of the former Carolingian castrum, a farm in Flers, and two-thirds of the revenues of the Annapes church; a chapter of canons was also created. His cloister extended northwest from the collegiate church, on the site of today's Place du Concert, to the Quai de la Basse Deûle (today's Avenue du Peuple Belge). After his death, the most powerful Count of Flanders was buried in the middle of the choir of the collegiate church of Saint-Pierre. Shortly afterward, Jean de Warneton, who was to become bishop, became one of his canons.

In 1088, Radbod, bishop of Tournai and Noyon, donated the church and prebends of Gits, north of Roeselare, to the collegiate church. These were the first in a series of acquisitions that would make the collegiate church of Saint-Pierre one of the most powerful landowners in the region.

For a long time, the body of Saint Hubert de Seclin rested here. The original collegiate church was Romanesque in style, and Tournai stone was used extensively in its construction.

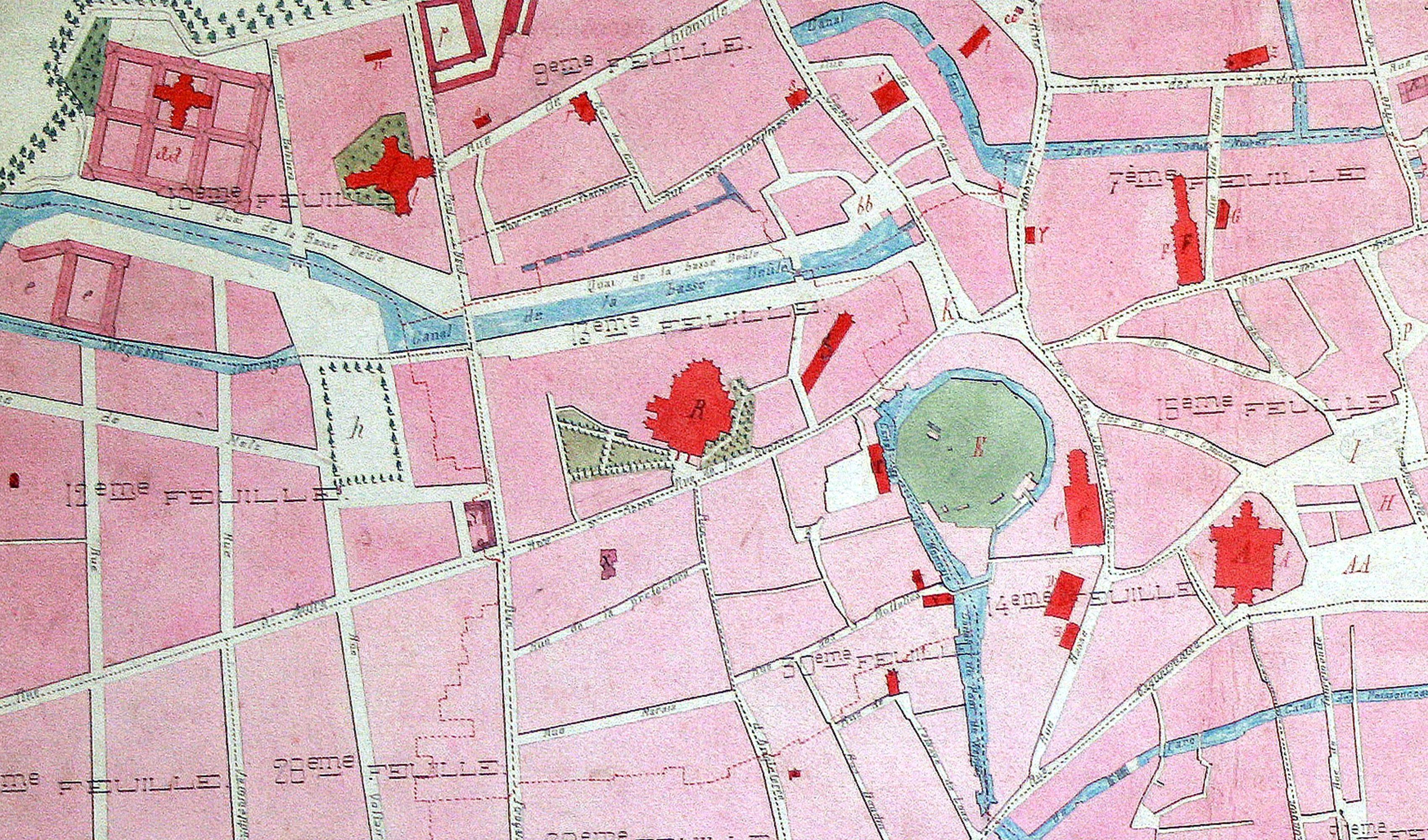
Location of Collégiale Saint-Pierre (R) next to avenue du Peuple Belge (Quai de la basse Deûle) in 1745.

=== The 13th century ===
==== Notre-Dame de la Treille ====
In the first half of this century, the collegiate church's chapter acquired the statue of Notre Dame de la Treille (the name used here for the Virgin Mary), made in the last quarter of the 11th century. The statue had a marble head, while the body and Infant Jesus were in polychrome white stone. Sadly, following the Battle of Mons-en-Pévèle in 1304, Lille was sacked by Philip the Fair's army, the collegiate church was burned and the statue all but destroyed: only the head remained.

==== Parish evolution ====
Like the parish of Saint-Étienne, the parish of Saint-Pierre was also reduced in size to allow for the creation of the parishes of Sainte-Catherine, Saint-André and La Madeleine. Finally, from this period onwards, schoolmasters taught in what had been the collegiate school; and, despite the opening of two secular schools in the 16th century, the canons and their lay affiliates retained the monopoly of Latin teaching in Lille for a long time to come.

=== Expansion of the collegiate church and its influence ===
==== The actions of Philip the Good (15th century) ====
In 1405, Countess Marguerite III of Flanders was buried here. Philip the Good, Duke of Burgundy and Count of Flanders, then had the collegiate church rebuilt and the statue restored to its knees. In 1425, he also founded a master's degree. The latter enabled the collegiate church to develop a polyphonic musical life of permanent quality. In 1462, the deed of foundation of the Hospice Gantois attached the latter to the collegiate church of Saint-Pierre.

As the collegiate church and its chapter gained in prestige, they attracted certain devotions to them, including that of Notre-Dame-des-Sept-Douleurs in the second half of the 15th century, a fact addressed by the Dominican Michel François de Templemars in 1495. Devotion to Notre-Dame-des-Sept-Douleurs in Lille already dated back to the 13th century, but Philippe Le Bon contributed to its expansion. Imbued with Marian piety, he often prayed to the Virgin Mary, mother of Jesus, and proved his fervor by having a wooden statue of Notre-Dame des sept douleurs carved and placed alongside the miraculous image of Notre-Dame de la Treille in the collegiate church around 1450.

==== The modern era ====
Devotion to Notre-Dame-des-Sept-Douleurs grew to such an extent that Popes Alexander III and Clement IX agreed to the creation of a specific office for the churches of Lille. This devotion continued to grow until the cathedral was destroyed in 1792. In 1634, Notre-Dame-de-la-Treille was named the city's patron saint and was originally officially celebrated on the Sunday after the Holy Trinity (since then, the date has been changed to October 28). During the War of Devolution, King Louis XIV took Lille in 1667, and, wishing to reassure the natives of their privileges and freedoms, he took an oath in front of Notre-Dame de la Treille, then finalized the statue by adding two complete legs.

=== Disappearance ===
The parish of Saint-Pierre was abolished on May 26, 1791. The collegiate church was put up for sale as national property in September 1792 and then destroyed. Devotion to Notre-Dame-des-Sept-Douleurs was restored to Sainte-Catherine on May 25, 1844.

== Architecture and furniture ==
=== Architecture ===
In the 13th century, the Romanesque collegiate church was transformed into a Gothic-style church with larger dimensions (although still smaller than those of the 18th century), its clerks taking inspiration from Soissons Cathedral: this event testified to the increase in power achieved during this century.

The final form of the collegiate church was equipped with a Gothic vault in 1504, and a rood screen acquired during the 16th century.

In 1635, following the success of the devotion, the canons had the seven painful stations of the Virgin erected, which are traversed like those of a Way of the Cross.

The remains of the Romanesque crypt of the collegiate church of Saint-Pierre are listed as historic monuments and can be accessed via a staircase from the rue du Palais de Justice. All that remains of the collegiate cloister are two arches from its last state, in a private garden on the Place du Concert. The cellar of the collegiate church is also intact, under the cellar of a private mansion in the same square.

=== Furniture ===
Most of the paintings known to have adorned the church were acquired during the 16th century. Some of the church's furnishings are preserved, for the most part, in Lille's museums or other churches, some of the works having been collected in 1792 at the former Récollets convent on rue des Arts in Lille:

- Jésus-Christ remettant les clefs à Saint-Pierre, high altar painting, by Charles de la Fosse, currently at the Palais des beaux-arts in Lille.
- Sainte Cécile, altar painting, by Arnould de Vuez, now in the Palais des beaux-arts de Lille.
- Bust of Saint-Pierre and Saint-Paul by Quellin, in the church of Saint-André, Lille.
- Sainte-Anne and her daughter, the Virgin Mary, sculpture in Saint-Vincent church, Marcq-en-Barœul.

== Tombs of the Counts of Flanders ==
=== Baudouin V of Flanders of Lille ===
Count Baldwin V of Flanders died in Lille on September 1, 1067. He is buried in the middle of the choir of the Collegiate Church. After the Collégiale burned down in 1334, the Count's tomb was restored with a new epitaph. Aubin-Louis Millin, in the fifth volume of “Antiquités nationales ou recueil de monuments” published in Year VII of the Republican calendar (1799-1800), writes of the tomb of Baudouin V:

Entering the church choir from the nave, we found this inscription on a flat tomb: Chy gist tres haus, tres nobles et tres poissans princes BAUDEWINS li DEBONNAIRES jadis contes de Flandres li onzieme, qui funda ceste église et trespassa en lan de grace mil LXVIII. Dites vo pater ner pour lame.

His tomb disappeared with the destruction of the collegiate church in 1806. However, his body was found during excavations at the beginning of the 21st century.

=== Louis II of Flanders, known as “Louis of Male" ===
Although he had a chapel built next to the Notre Dame church in Courtrai for his burial, the Chapelle des Comtes, Louis de Male was not buried there.

On March 1, 1384, his remains were laid to rest in the Collégiale alongside his wife, Marguerite de Brabant († 1380). Marguerite III of Flanders, daughter of the deceased, joined them after she died in Arras on March 16, 1405, while her husband, Philippe le Hardi, was buried at the Chartreuse de Champol in Burgundy. Her tomb, dismantled during the French Revolution, can now be seen at Dijon's Musée des Beaux-Arts.

The tomb, made of gilded bronze, was located in the Notre-Dame de la Treille chapel. The monument, which was a long square, was decorated on all four sides with 24 copper figures, eighteen inches high, depicting, surrounded by various emblems, the princes and princesses of the spouses' houses. Aubin-Louis Millin gives a full description in his compendium of monuments.

Louis of Male's tomb, with its three recumbent figures, could be seen in Lille's collegiate church until the French Revolution. After the destruction of the church, the tomb escaped revolutionary destruction and was moved to Lille's old town hall. However, traces of it were lost after 1830.

=== Other tombs ===
In his “Antiquités Nationales ou recueil de monuments” (1799-1800), Aubin-Louis Millin describes numerous other tombs in the collegiate church, including those of Hugues de Launoy and his wife Marguerite de Molembais, as well as those of various princes from the houses of Flanders and Burgundy.

== Location of the collegiate church ==
On the site of the collegiate church, the courthouse was built in the early 1830s and Rue Alphonse Colas opened in 1821.

Place du Concert occupies the site of the canons' cloister.

== Gallery ==
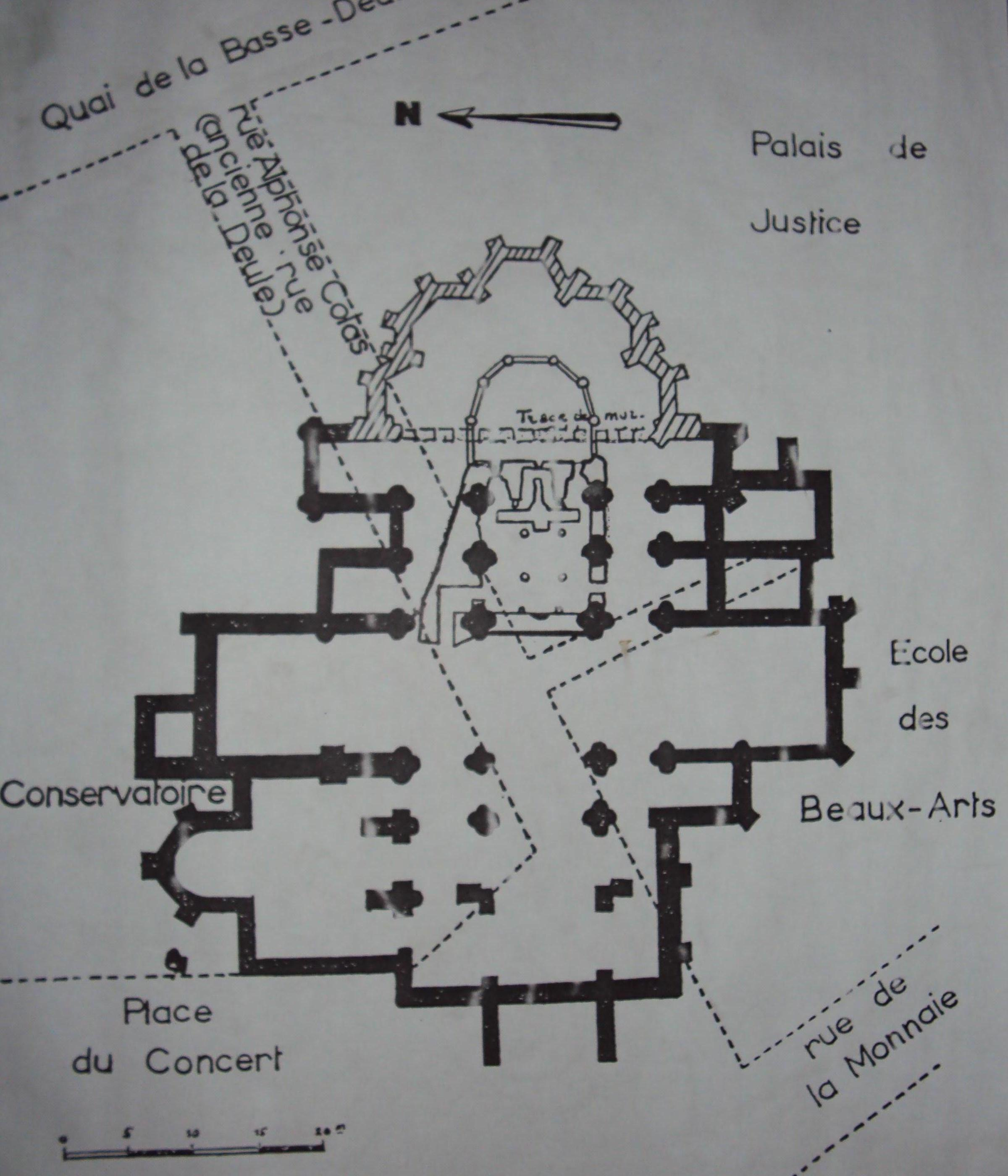

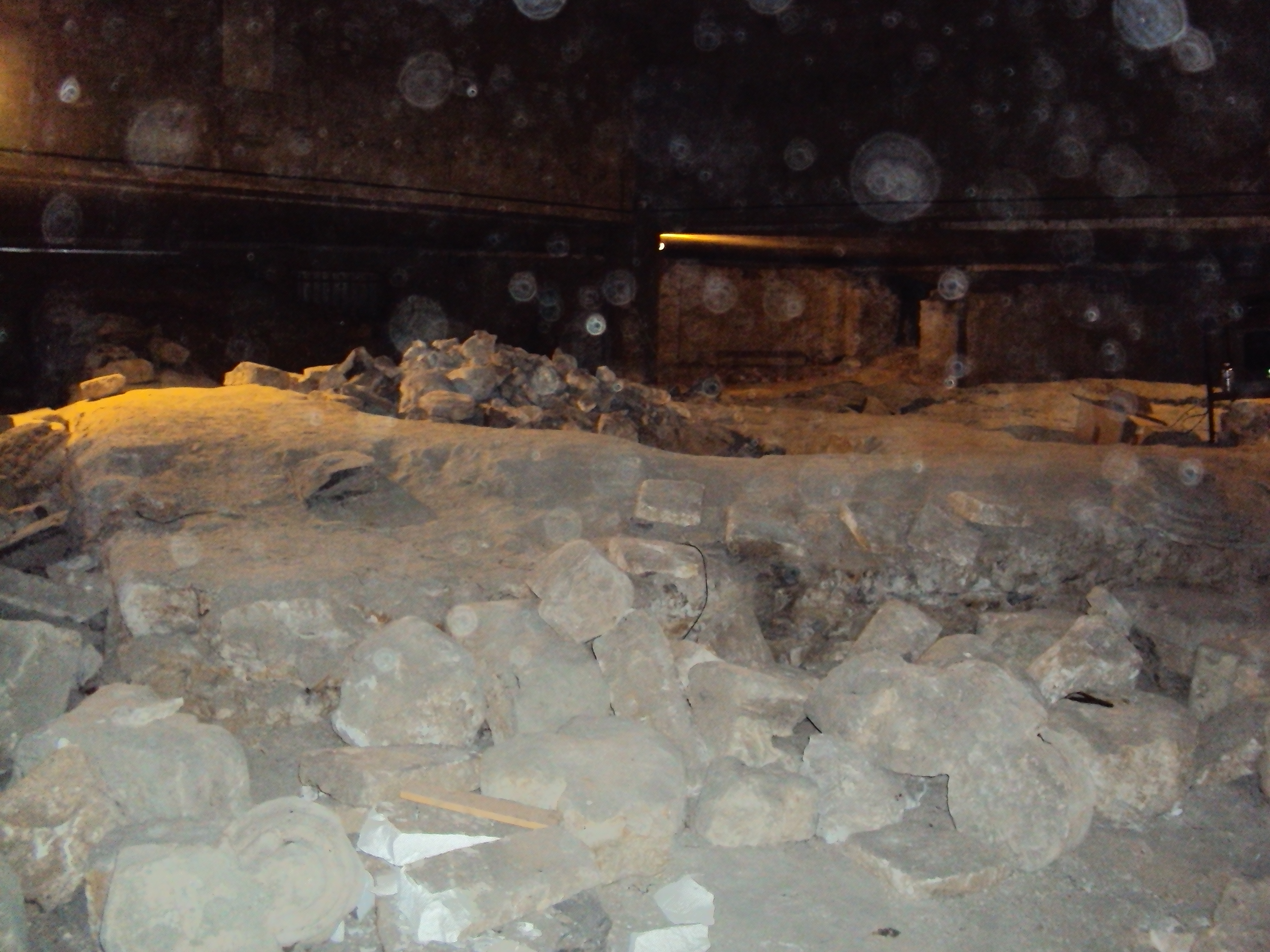
Crypt view

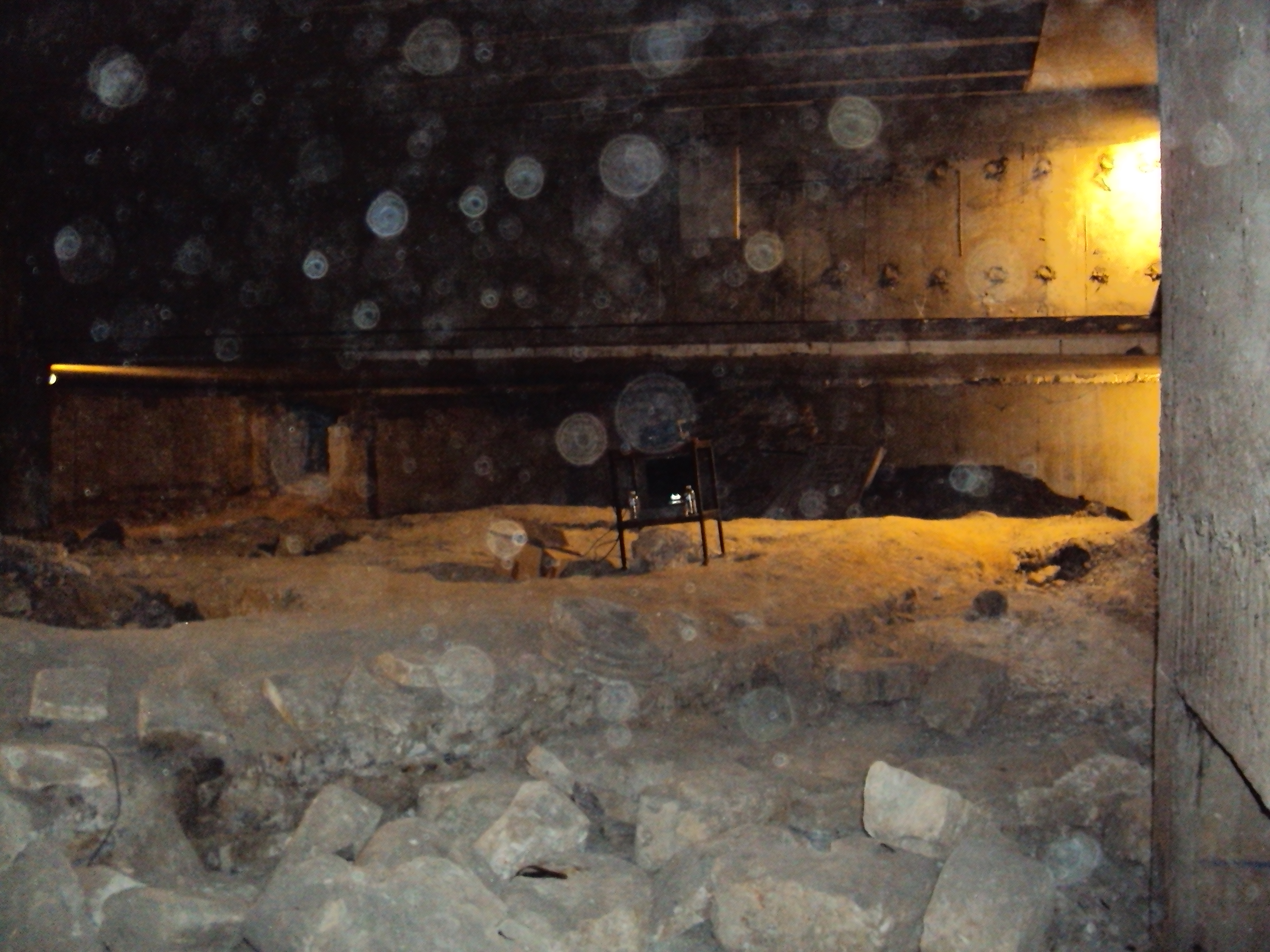
Crypt view

== See also ==
- Lille
- Rue Esquermoise
- Citadel of Lille
- Vieux-Lille

== Bibliography ==
- Trénard, Louis. Histoire d'une métropole.
- Essai historique sur la Collégiale de Saint-Pierre à Lille. Lille: L. Lefort. 1850.
- Hautcœur, Édouard (1894). Cartulaire de l'église collégiale de Saint-Pierre de Lille. Deux tomes. L. Quarré. A. Picard.
- Hautcœur, Édouard (1895). Documents liturgiques et nécrologiques de l'église collégiale de Saint-Pierre de Lille. Lille: L. Quarré, libraire; Paris: A. Picard, libraire.
- Regnault-Warin, Julius Junius (1803). Lille ancienne et moderne. Lille: Castiaux.
- Jessu, Philippe; Leman, Pierre (1964). "Les fouilles de la Collégiale Saint-Pierre de Lille". Revue du Nord. 46 (181): 129–158. doi:10.3406/rnord.1964.2492.
- Jessu, Philippe (1966). Rapport sur les fouilles exécutées à Lille à l'emplacement de l'ancienne collégiale St-Pierre (Avril-Juillet 1966). Revue du Nord.
- Gardelles, Jacques (1968). Un grand édifice disparu: la collégiale Saint-Pierre à Lille. Bulletin Monumental.
- Blieck, Gilles (1986). "Les fouilles de la collégiale Saint-Pierre de Lille. Le site. Les fouilles de 1985". Revue du Nord. 68 (268): 121–152. doi:10.3406/rnord.1986.4195.
- Blieck, Gilles (1987). Les fouilles de la collégiale Saint-Pierre de Lille. II. Le matériel. L'interprétation historique. Revue du Nord.
- Thiébaut, Jacques (2006). Collégiale Saint-Pierre dans Nord gothique. Picardie, Artois, Flandre, Hainaut: Les édifices religieux. Éditions A. et J. Picard. ISBN 2-7084-0738-4.
