= Lille 3000 =

Lille's culture event

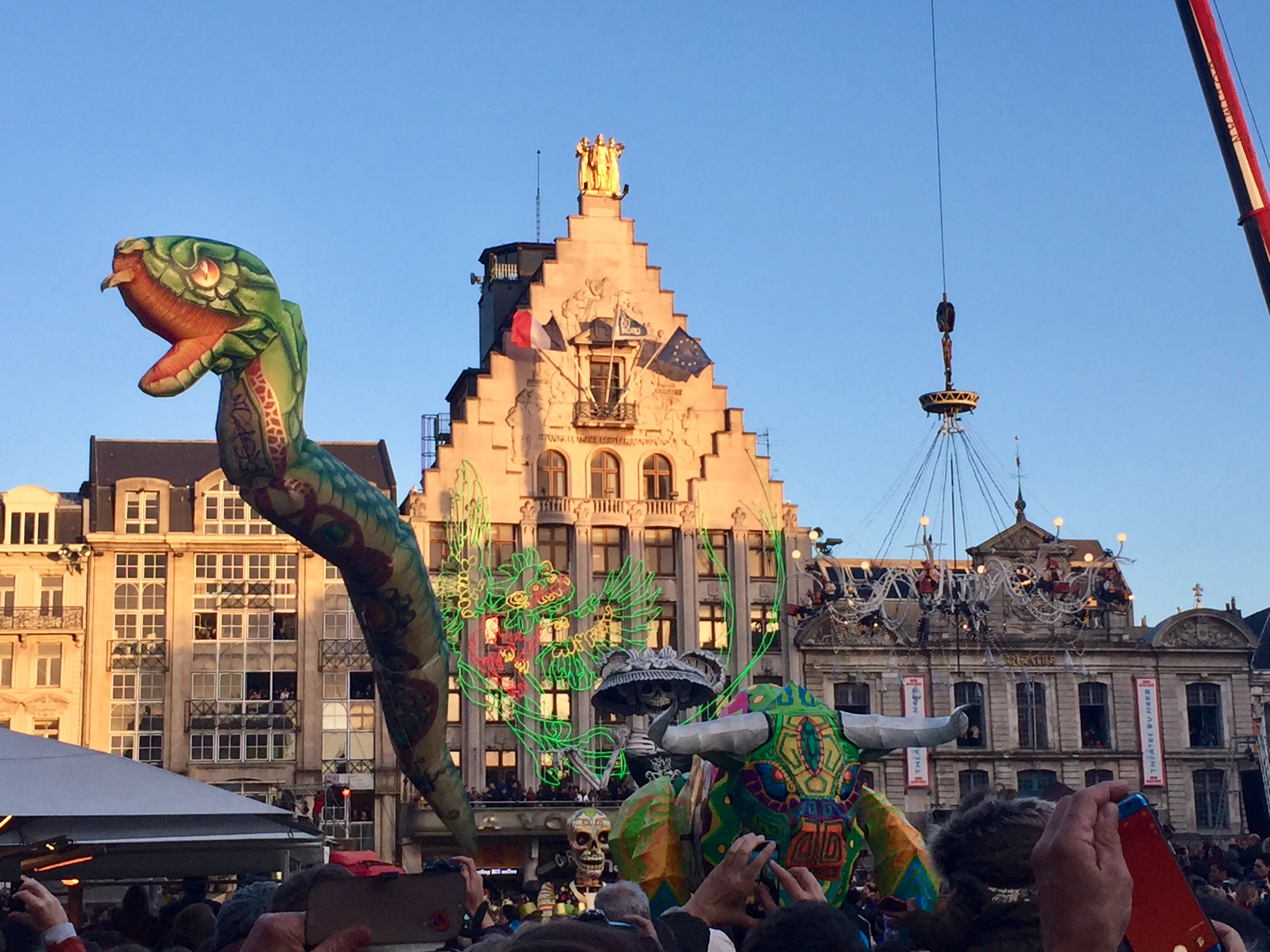
- Formation: 2005
- Type: Event
- Website: https://lille3000.com/

Lille 3000 is an association representing a cultural program promoted by the city of Lille and the Lille 2004 organizing committee.

Lille 3000 is intended as a continuation of the dynamism instilled by Lille in 2004 as the European Capital of Culture.

Lille 3000 reuses the cultural venues created or renovated for Lille 2004 (Tri Postal, Maisons Folies etc.); but also creates new ones (rehabilitation of the former Saint Sauveur goods station, which became a cultural center in 2009, etc.).

Together with the city, the association manages several of the cultural facilities mentioned above, and regularly organizes a wide range of activities, metamorphoses, shows, and exhibitions.

Every three years or so since 2006, Lille 3000 has also presented a series of major themed cultural events (cultural seasons) lasting several months and attracting millions of visitors, under the artistic direction of Didier Fusillier. These events open with a grand parade through the streets of Lille.

== History ==
=== Bombayser de Lille ===
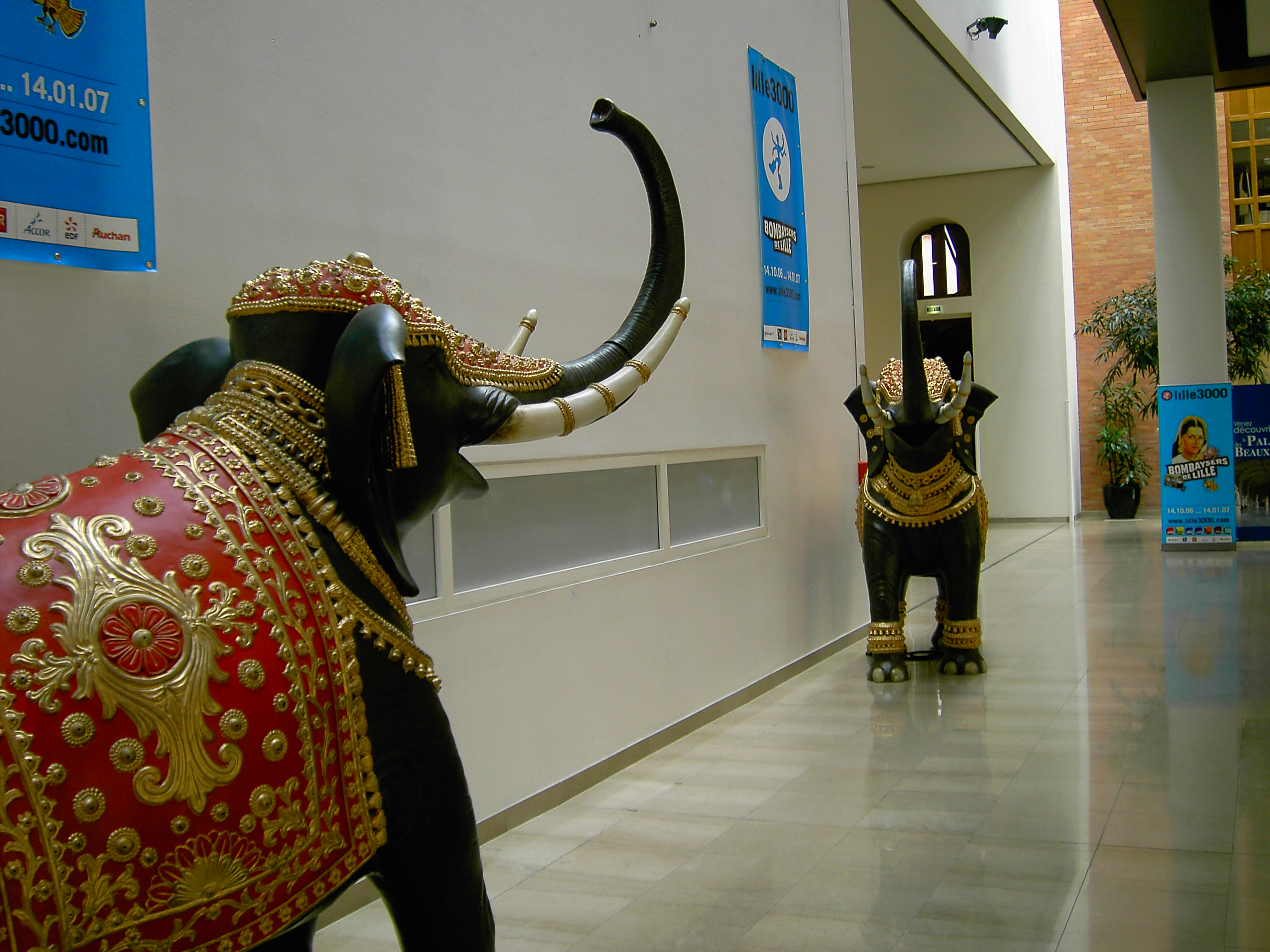

The main theme of Lille 3000's first cultural season, which ran from October 14, 2006, to January 14, 2007, was India, at the crossroads of art and modernity. It involved the organization of 450 events, including music, cinema, theater, dance, meetings, and exhibitions, attracting nearly a million visitors.

The Lille 3000 themes related to India were divided into several distinct categories, each held at different venues according to a calendar;

- Music
- Film, literature and fashion
- Exhibitions
- Theater
- Dance
- Maisons Folie
- Midi Midi
- Metamorphosis

=== Europe XXL ===
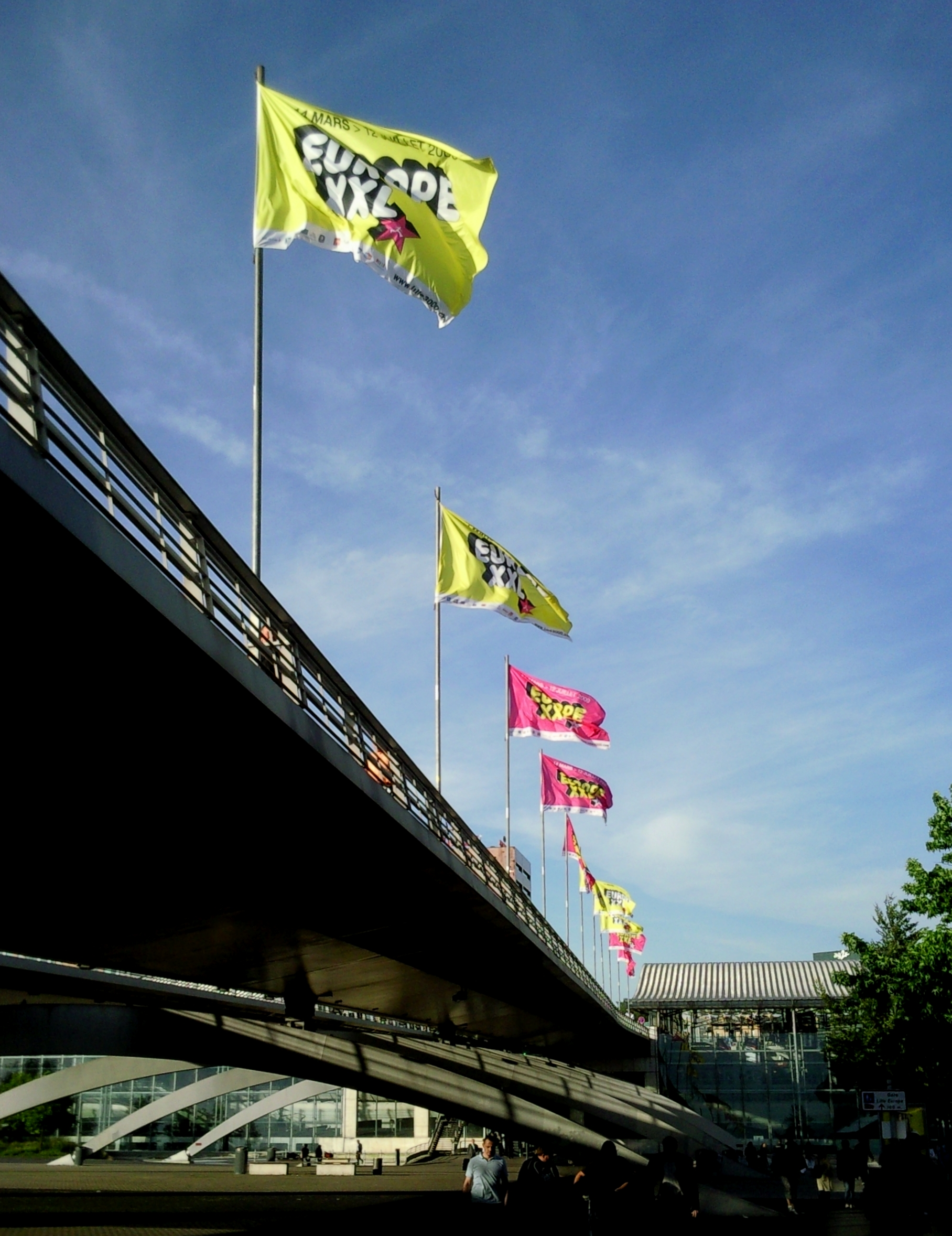
XXL European flags

The second season of Lille 3000, entitled Europe XXL, ran from March 14 to July 12, 2009. Its main theme was Eastern Europe, to mark the twentieth anniversary of the fall of the Berlin Wall. It led to the organization of around 500 events and some 50 exhibitions and attracted almost a million visitors.

=== Fantastic ===
Lille 3000's third season ran from October 6, 2012, to January 13, 2013. Its theme was the world of the supernatural, the fantastic, and the strange. It attracted almost two million visitors.

In addition to several shows and events, the season included installations throughout the city and numerous exhibitions in the metropolis' main museums.

=== Renaissance ===
Lille 3000's fourth season kicked off on September 26, 2015, inaugurated by a grand parade through the streets of Lille. This season aimed to showcase the vitality of the contemporary world, via numerous exhibitions and urban metamorphoses. The beginning of the 21st century embodies a turbulent era from which a new world is emerging, embodied here by major cities; represented for this edition were Rio, Detroit, Eindhoven, Phnom Penh and Seoul.

Renaissance attracted 1.6 million visitors.

=== Eldorado ===
Lille 3000's fifth season runs from April to December 2019 on the theme of Mexico. Eldorado attracted over 2.5 million visitors.

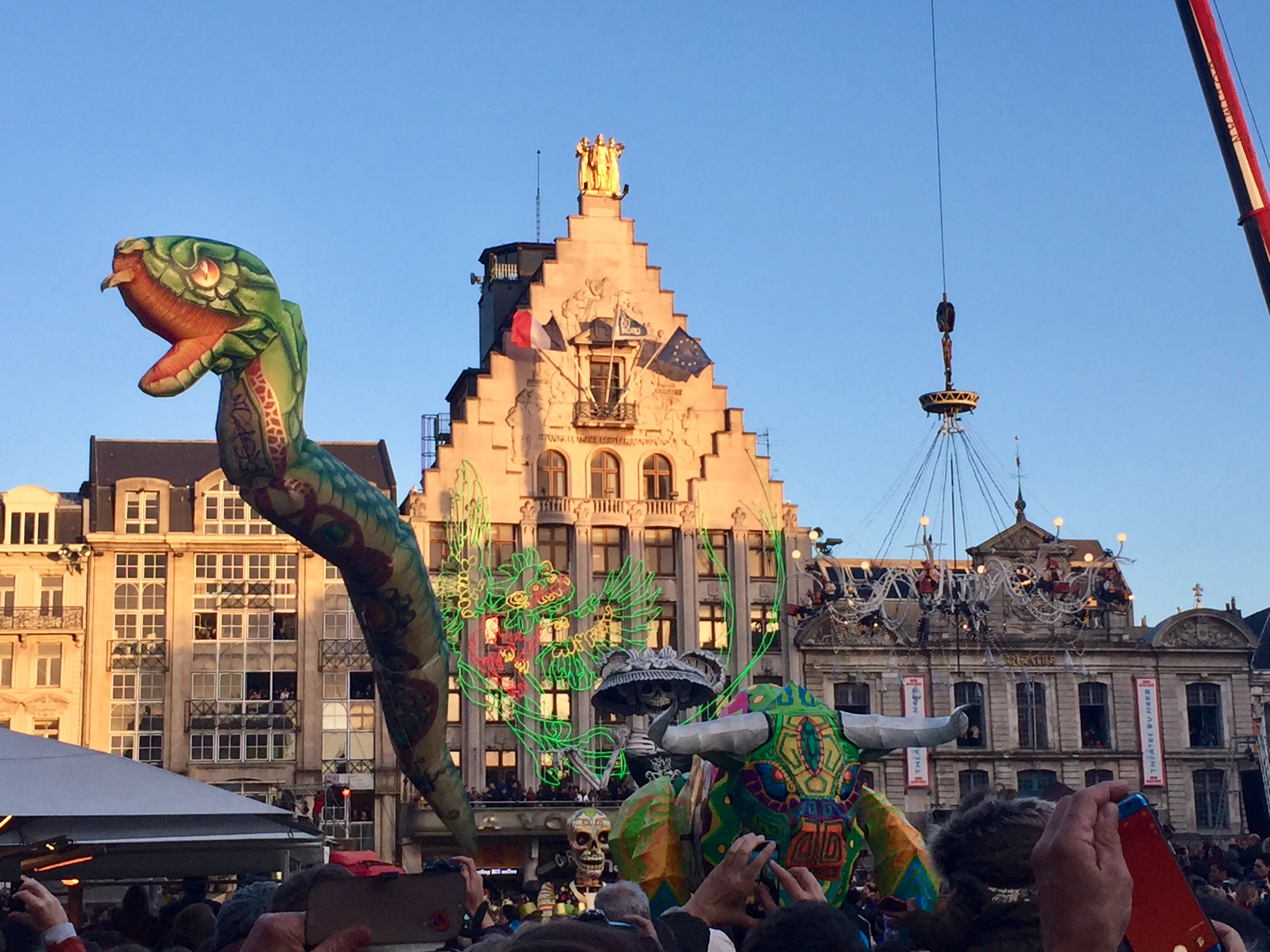
The Eldorado parade

=== The Great Eldorado Parade ===
==== The parade schedule ====
This parade was composed mainly of five floats. There were many elements of the 2018 Fiesta de los Muertos sent by Mexico; but also harmonies, amateur participants and professional companies invited for the occasion. Four floats were imagined, decorated and orchestrated by Roubaix-based collective Art Point M: the Dia de los Muertos float featuring mariachis; the Frida-Khalo float; the Alebrijes float accompanied by Compagnie du Tire-Laine; and the Lucha Libre float re-enacting a live wrestling match.

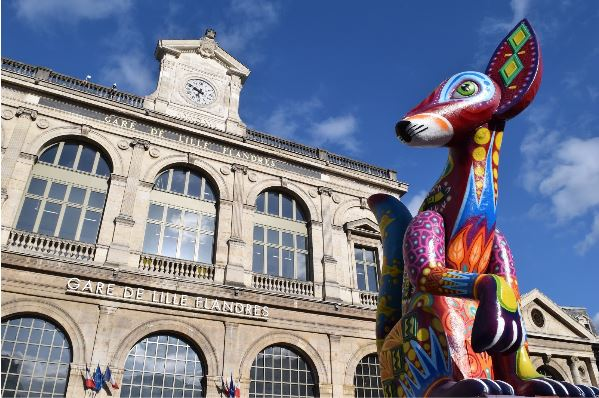
One of the ten alebrijes stands vigil in front of Lille Flandres station. These fantastic creatures were created by Pedro Linares López in 1936. Alebrijes are statues made of wood or papier-mâché. Rue Faidherbe is home to ten of these monumental sculptures, created in partnership with artisans from Mexico City's Museum of Popular Art, the City of Mexico (Artsumex), Mexico City's El Volador workshops and lille3000.

In all, a dozen bands and 3,000 dancers, musicians and people in make-up or disguises paraded around the floats in Mexican colors.

==== Parade entertainment ====
On Saturday, May 4, 2019, the festivities got underway at 3 pm at Tripostal and the Euralille shopping center, where children and adults got ready in make-up, costume, mask, and wreath workshops until 6 pm. And at 3 p.m., a flash mob set the pace in Place du Théâtre, opposite the Lille Opera House.

==== Musiques de la parade ====
During the parade, many artists were present on the floats. On the Dia de Los Muertos (“Day of the Dead”) float, the Mexican music group Mariachi Cocula6 was on hand to entertain the people of Lille along the established route. For the float representing Mexican painter Frida Kahlo, group 4cascabel6 played the Fandango, a musical genre with Latin and African influences. On the Alebrijes float (wooden statues representing fantastic animals and creatures), the Compagnie du Tire-Laine, an orchestra based in the Moulins district, brought together over sixty musicians. After the parade, they organized a grand ball on the Place du Théâtre at the end of the evening.

The festivities continued after the parade ended, from 10 pm to 1 am. Musicians from Soundtruck and DJ El Frances improvised a music studio in a Volkswagen van near Rue Nationale. In the Place du Théâtre, the group Kumbia Boruka, founded by Hernan Cortes, got the tourists up and dancing with its blend of Mexican accordion and Jamaican reggae. Other groups, such as Mariachi Los Tarasco and Theator Tol, offered songs and music from all over the world. Electro-house music was also in the spotlight on Place Rihour, where DJ Batichica, originally from Guadalajara in Mexico, presented a set of EDM (Electronic Dance Music).

==== Parade safety ====
Along the entire parade route, between Place des Buisses and Champ de Mars, 250,000 spectators gathered to watch the nearly 800-meter-long procession pass by. The organizers had set up a restricted and regulated traffic and parking plan. A protective perimeter was set up by the national police in downtown Lille from 3 pm to 2 am. Streets affected by the parade were closed to traffic from 6.30 pm to 2 am. In some streets downstream from the starting point, visitors waited for two hours for the parade to pass. Most were on foot along the routes reserved for the floats, which slowed the parade's progress to the Champ de Mars.

==== Parade postponed ====
The parade, scheduled for Saturday, April 27, 2019, has been postponed to Saturday, May 4, 2019, due to weather conditions (forecasts of high winds threatened the smooth running of the parade). The decision was taken on Thursday, April 25 by the lille3000 organization, Lille City Council, and the Nord prefecture. It was the first time in five editions that a lille3000 parade had been postponed. As a result of the postponement, some installations originally scheduled for the parade were not present.

== Exhibitions ==
For this season, a number of exhibitions on the theme of El Dorado (myth, travel, migration, nature, etc.) have been set up (see sub-sections below). Other major exhibitions are also on offer at the Palais des Beaux-Arts in Lille, the Piscine in Roubaix, the Louvre-Lens and the Frac Grand Large in Dunkirk.

Mexican muralists, the “Tlacolulokos” duo (named after their native village), have been invited to paint three murals in the Mexican tradition, with local inspiration; two exhibitions are devoted to the art of fresco.

=== Eldorama ===
Le Tripostal hosts the Eldorado exhibition from April 27 to September 1, 2019. In three chapters, it retraces the great story of Eldorado. On the second floor, visitors will find the Dream Worlds section. The second floor features The Rush. Finally, on the top floor of the building, visitors can find the section entitled Un eldorado sans fin. Chinese artist Chen Zhen's dragon and Japanese artist Yayoi Kusama's light piece are also on show.

=== Intenso/Mexicano ===
In this exhibition at the Hôtel de l'Hospice Comtesse from April 27 to August 30, 2019, visitors can discover works by the great names of Mexican art: Frida Kahlo, Diego Rivera, José Clemente Orozco and Manuel Álvarez Bravo. In all, 48 paintings, prints, and photographs from the permanent collection of Mexico City's Museo de Arte Moderno. The exhibition covers the Mexican 20th century.

=== US-Mexico/Border ===
From April 27 to July 28, Maison Folie in Wazemmes will be exhibiting “the work of contemporary artists who explore the border as both a physical reality and a subject of imagination and experimentation, enabling projects to emerge and solutions to be found”. The exhibition was previously presented in Los Angeles, at the Craft & Folk Art Museum. Drawings, architecture, sculpture, painting, and photography are on show, demonstrating the crossover between the different disciplines.

=== The Green Goddess ===
From April 27 to November 3, 2019, the Gare Saint Sauveur is hosting the “La Déesse Verte” exhibition, which draws a parallel between art and nature. A vast greenhouse has been reconstituted and embellished by the works of some twenty artists, who raise issues such as the overexploitation of nature and the effects of the human kingdom on the ecosystem.

=== Curiosity ===
From April 27 to July 13, 2019, Lille's natural history museum is exhibiting collections from Mexico City's Museum of Popular Art, referring to Mexico's traditional culture and imaginary world.

== Public installations ==
=== Alebrijes ===
In front of Lille Flandres station, rue Faidherbe, ten large-format alebrijes - statues of half-real, half-fantastic animals from Mexican folklore - have been installed. Installed at the end of April, they will remain there for 8 months until December.

=== Calaveras ===
Giant skulls, or Calaveras, manufactured by an undertaker, have been painted and decorated by Mexican artists and placed around town, mainly in the garden of the Ilot Comtesse.

=== Monumental chandelier ===
Designed by the Transe Express company, which made its name at the 1992 Albertville Olympic Games, the celestial chandelier is installed in Lille's Grand Palace. Suspended from a crane, it comprises eight branches at the ends of which musicians play, their weight ensuring the stability of the installation. Wind instruments, ground instruments, and frenzied rhythms are on the program, transforming the public square into a ballroom. The suspended orchestra is accompanied by acrobats, who soar several meters high between earth and sky.

=== Museum Of The Moon ===
Located in the heart of Lille Flandres train station, the Museum Of The Moon is a ten-meter inflatable moon suspended above the ground. It was created by English artist Luke Gerram from NASA lunar images and will be on view until December 2019.

=== Soles de Oro ===
Created by Mexican visual artist Betsabeé Romero, the Soleils d'or are dozens of mirrors set up in the Old Stock Exchange in the capital of Flanders. Concave in shape and linked together at the height of just a few meters, they produce a variety of light effects, much to the delight of passers-by.

=== Retouched fresco ===
A mural painted as part of Eldorado on a wall in Lille-Moulins, entitled Hydrates toi d'urbaine liqueur, has been strongly criticized by the Alliance police union. The mural depicted three women in Mexican muralist style, one of whom bore the word ACAB (an acronym for All Cops Are Bastards) on her arm, which the artists said referred to the frequent corruption in the Mexican police force. The artists themselves erased the word ACAB in April 1912.

=== Counter-festival ===
Elnorpadcado is a counter-festival organized to protest the 2019 Lille 3000 “Eldorado” edition. It ran from April 26 to December 1, 2019. The organizers of this counter-festival are protesting against the gigantism of Lille3000 and its cultural seasons, which in their view are not designed for the people of Lille and Northern France, but to attract an essentially foreign audience: “We're simply saying stop, enough is enough! Since 2004, lille3000 has been proposing huge projects, with excessive communication. At this stage, it's perversion! The festival was triggered by a public outcry against the city's incoherence in proposing these outrageous events, while at the same time implementing a much-criticized concreting plan. One project, in particular, has crystallized all the tensions: the rehabilitation of the Friche Saint-Sauveur, which will be largely concreted over (notably for the construction of a new swimming pool and housing), while the people of Lille have been calling for more green space for years.

Some players in Lille's cultural life also questioned the Lille 3000 model and its organization. Thomas Werquin, president of Axe Culture, an association that defines itself as a “citizen think tank” in favor of public debate, criticized Lille 3000's disconnection with its territory. In particular, he regrets: "The festival is not an opportunity to better understand the roots of the people of Lille. For Thomas Werquin, there is a cultural urgency to get to know each other better, which is not that of “parties and glitter”. For him, other cultures should be given pride of place, such as those of the Maghreb and Black Africa, or the Roma. The importance given to Eldorado over the whole of Lille's cultural life has also been criticized: the theme of Mexico is said to have been imposed on Lille's cultural institutions, which are condemned to integrate it in one way or another into their programming, on pain of losing out on subsidies.

== Utopia ==
The sixth edition of Lille 3000 takes place from May 14 to October 2, 2022, under the name Utopia. It aims to focus on “the links that unite Man with the living. Rather than perpetuating the anthropocentric conception of the world, Utopia will propose the visions of artists, inventors, creators and scientists who question the hierarchy between man and nature“.

Works presented at Utopia

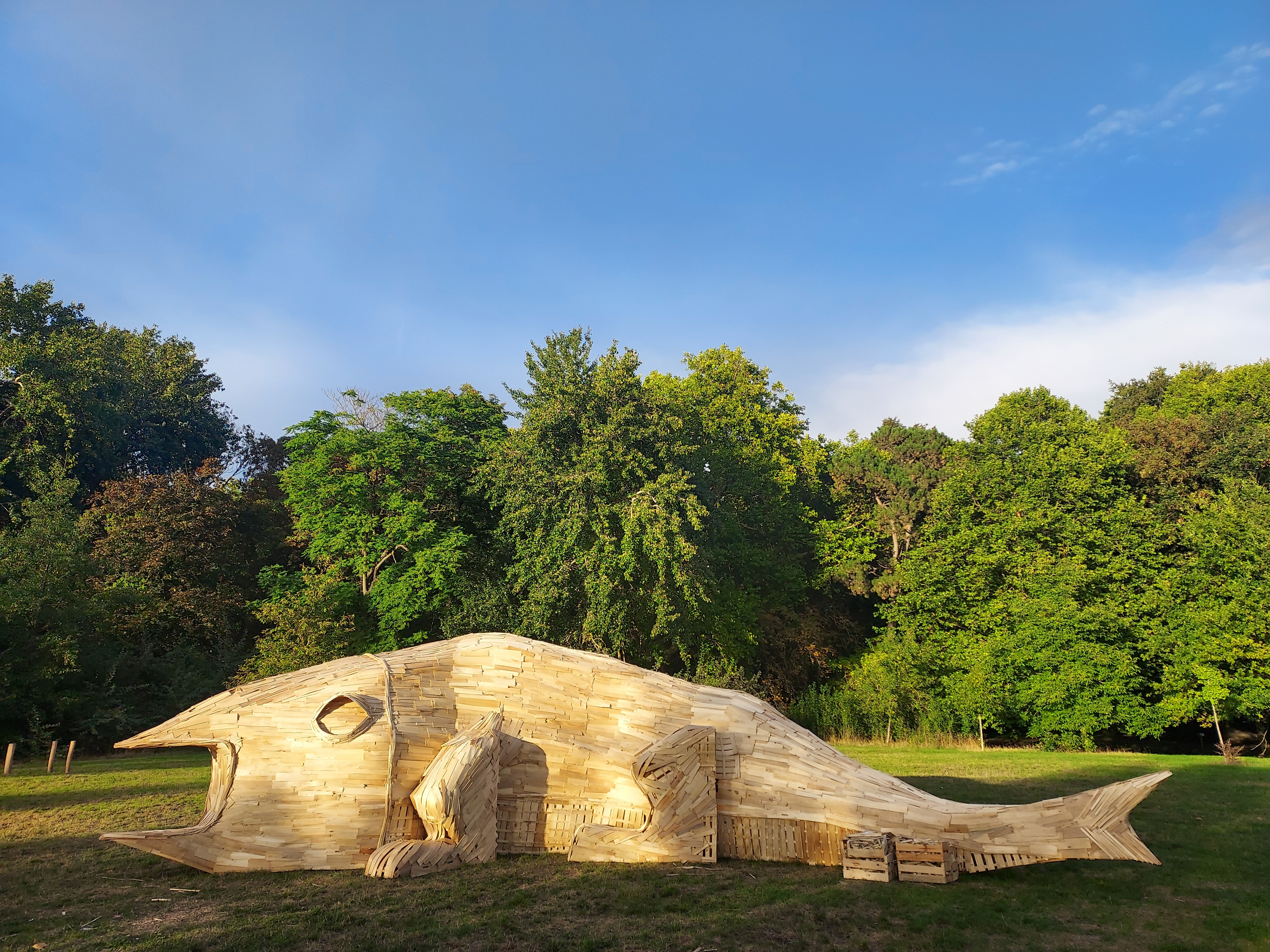
The Artimuse collective offers works made from wooden crates

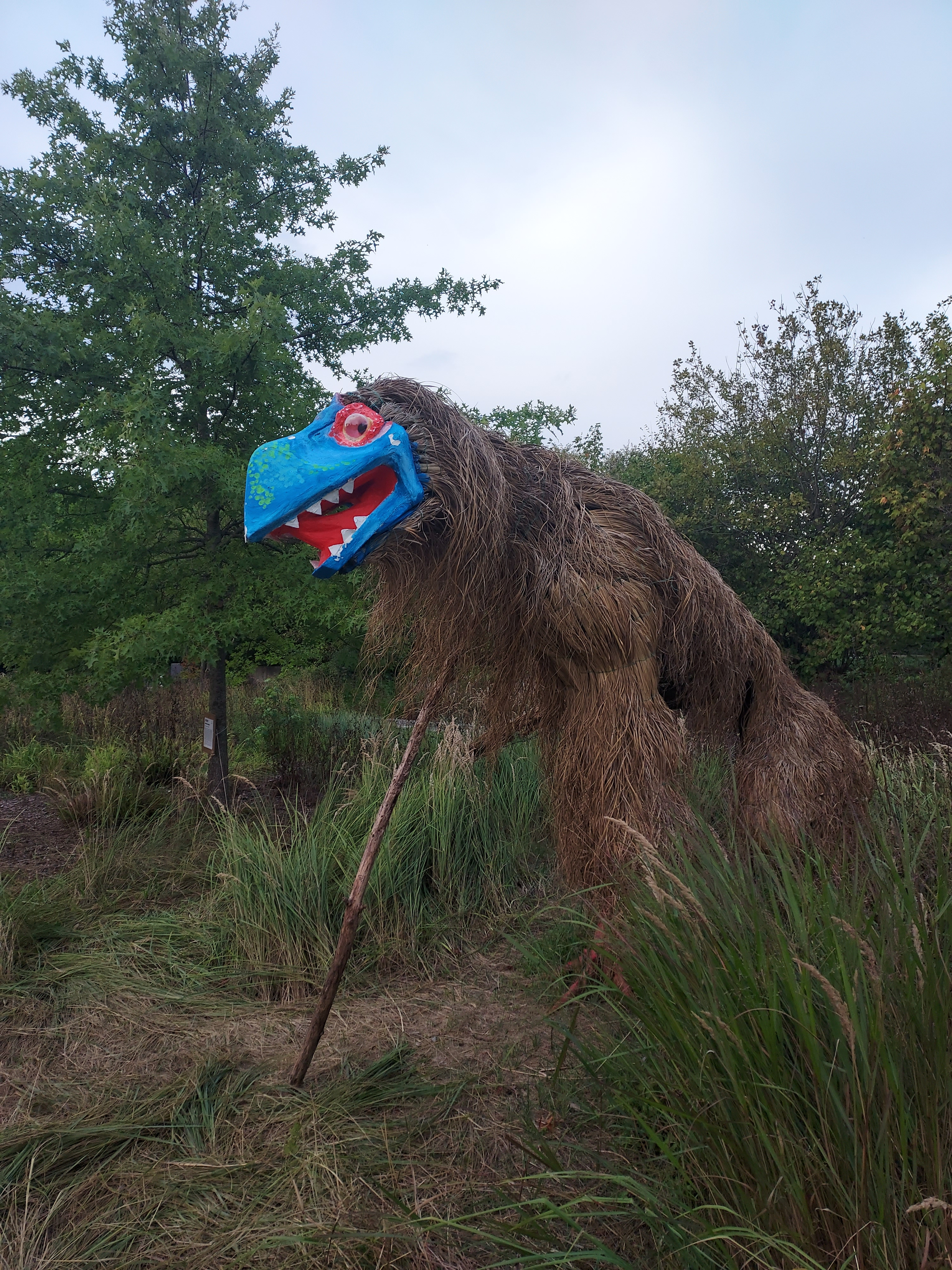
eDline Bianco, Therizinosaurus

== Cost and economic benefits ==
Lille 3000's annual resources are distributed as follows: the city of Lille finances between €2.3 and €3.2 million, the MEL between €600,000 and €900,000, the Hauts-de-France region €1 million (supported by the French Ministry of Culture and the European Union); and private sponsorship contributes an average of 34% of the association's resources (EDF, Auchan, Caisse d'épargne, AG2R, Air-France, Accor groups). Lille 3000 and its cultural events are an undeniable asset for the image of the city and the metropolis, but the touristic and economic spin-offs are questionable: in Lille's hotels, since the majority of visitors come from the region and the metropolis, the spin-offs are small but not negligible. Museums, on the other hand, see a sharp increase in visitors during the cultural seasons.

According to Médiacités, however, traditional festivals are just as popular with the people of Lille as the Lille 3000 events. Lille 3000 reports 110 million euros in economic spin-offs for the region in connection with its 2015 “Renaissance” event. Based on tourism data and a survey by the Metropole de Lille, the CRC recalculated earnings at around 65 million. However, Lille 3000 is regularly criticized by its opponents for being a commercial or political operation or for costing too much.

== See also ==
- Lille
- Rue Esquermoise
- Citadel of Lille

== Bibliography ==
- Douniès, T. (2007). Collectif Degeyter, Sociologie de Lille. Lectures.
- Gravari-Barbas, M.; Jacquot, S. (2007). L'événement, outil de légitimation de projets urbains: l'instrumentalisation des espaces et des temporalités événementiels à Lille et Gênes. Géocarrefour.
- Liefooghe, C. (2010). "Lille 2004, capitale européenne de la culture ou la quête d'un nouveau modèle de développement". Méditerranée. Revue géographique des pays méditerranéens/Journal of Mediterranean geography.
- Lusso, B.; Grégoris, M. T. (2014). Pérenniser l'événementiel culturel dans la métropole lilloise après la Capitale européenne de la culture: le rôle des acteurs dans les manifestations de Lille 3000. Rives méditerranéennes.
- Paris, D.; Baert, T. (2011). Lille 2004 and the role of culture in the regeneration of Lille métropole. Town Planning Review.
