= Eva Durrleman =

Éva Durrleman
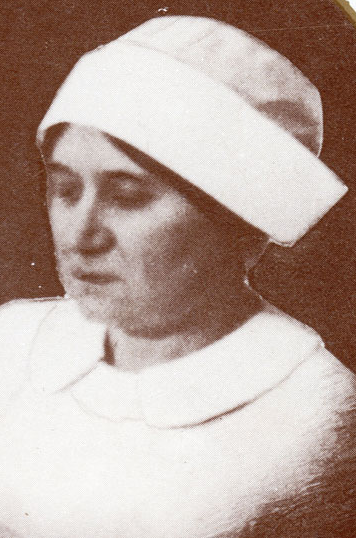
- Éva Durrleman, c. 1940
- Born: 19 August 1891; Rochefort, Charente-Maritime
- Died: 15 June 1993; Châtelet, Meudon, France
- Years active: 1923-1956
- Parent(s): Jean Durrleman (1852-1936) and Lydie Pons (deceased 1920)
- Relatives: Siblings: Freddy(1881-1944), Lily (1882), Lina (1883), Arthur (1885), Nelly (1888), and Clara (1893)
- Awards: Righteous Among the Nations (29 November 1990)

Éva Durrleman (19 August 1891 – 15 June 1993) was a co-founder and director of the Ambroise-Paré hospital and nursing school in Lille, France. She was declared Righteous Among the Nations by Yad Vashem on 29 November 1990 for helping to protect Jewish men, women, and children from deportation to Nazi concentration camps during World War II.

== Formative years ==
Born in Rochefort, Charente-Maritime, Éva Durrleman (19 August 1891 – 15 June 1993) was the sixth daughter of Jean Durrleman (1852-1936), a pastor-evangelist who was a native of Switzerland, and Lydie Pons (deceased 1920).

Durrleman was educated in Bordeaux at the Protestant Health Center's school of nursing, which was headed by Anna Hamilton (1864-1935).

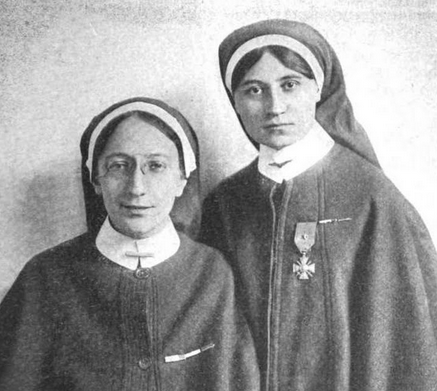
Thérèse Matter and Éva Durrleman, from a 1920 publication

== Founding of the Ambroise-Paré hospital and nursing school ==
Following the end of World War I, Durrleman and three of her fellow nursing school graduates, Alice Bianquis, Thérèse Matter, and Madeleine Rives, joined together to launch a new nursing school and hospital in the north of France. They were assisted by Pastor Henri Nick of Fives-Lille, who recommended three suitable buildings on the Rue Saint-Maur (later Émile Zola) in Lille. After securing the funds to purchase those buildings, Durrleman and Matter opened the Ambroise-Paré hospital and school of nursing, and began offering training to young women on 18 November 1923. As hospital admissions and nursing school enrollments grew, the two co-founders, who had continued to manage the Protestant church-affiliated facilities after the respective marriages of Bianquis and Rives, subsequently hired Léa Ménard and Hélène Lavignotte to assist with administration. On 18 November 1933 the successful nursing program transitioned into a boarding school for nursing students.

== World War II ==
After the early May 1940 occupation of Luxembourg and Belgium by military forces of Nazi Germany, and the subsequent bombing by German aircraft of a railroad line in Lambersart, a suburb of Lille, where Durrleman, Matter, and their colleagues were still operating the Ambroise-Paré hospital and school of nursing, German army troops laid siege to Lille from 27 May until 1 June. Following an attack on French and British forces stationed west of the Deûle river by three divisions of panzer tanks, the French and British soldiers were ultimately forced to withdraw, leaving roughly one thousand Senegalese soldiers and a small number of other troops to defend Lille. Trying to hold out at multiple spots within and near the city, including the Rue de Solférino, Rue Nationale, Haute-Deûle, and Citadel of Lille, the resisters were eventually forced to surrender. On 1 June the defeated French soldiers were marched to the Place du Général-de-Gaulle (also known as the Grand'Place), where the German army was headquartered.

Just over two years later, on 11 September 1942, Durrleman and Matter became actively involved in rescuing Jews when French police, in concert with Nazi authorities, began rounding up Jewish men, women and children from Lille and its surrounding areas. Taken to the railroad station at Five-Lille, they were slated for deportation to concentration camps. Among those arrested were Fanny Baran, her ten-year-old son Maurice, and her four-month old infant Michel, who were taken from their home at 52 Rue de la Vignette. Baran's oldest boy was rescued shortly thereafter when Georgette Vandenabaele-Franchois, Baran's sixteen-year-old maid, was able to secure help from Lille railroad workers in removing Maurice Baran from the area where he was being detained after informing guards that she had arrived to deliver clothes to the family.

Meanwhile, Durrleman and Matter worked to rescue Michel Baran. Matter, who spoke German, was able to facilitate their access to the infant by convincing the Nazi guards that she and Durrleman were German nurses sent to check on the child. Forced to make repeated visits to Fanny Baran in order to persuade her to let them save her baby's life, they realized that the guards' growing suspicion was putting them in all in jeopardy, and ultimately sent another German-speaking nurse, France Neubert, to bring the infant out of the station.

Fanny Baran was subsequently deported to a concentration camp. (Her husband, Abraham Baran, had been deported previously while attempting to cross into France's southern zone to find a place of asylum for his wife and sons.

Consequently, Vandenabaele-Franchois took Maurice to the home of her parents, Marcel and Madeleine Franchois, where he remained until 1945. Durrleman took charge of Michel, and cared for him until 1946.

=== Others rescued by Durrleman and Matter ===
Durrleman and Matter also helped to hide Maurice Serfati and Hélène and Perla Lipsyck. Serfati, who had jumped from a train to escape his deportation to Drancy, was hidden briefly at the hospital from the Gestapo by the two women, who had told their nursing staff that he was a nephew. Several weeks later, they helped Serfati connect with an underground resistance group. They sheltered the Lipsyck sisters after their mother was deported with their father, a ritual slaughterer in Lille's Jewish community. Telling their staff that the sixteen-year-old Hélène and eighteen-year-old Perla were nursing students, the women were subsequently forced to find a new hiding place for the girls when the mother of one of their nursing students complained.

== Post-war life ==
After war's end, Durrleman and Mattert successfully reunited the Baran brothers and secured adoptions for them with a Jewish family, the Marszaks. Both women remained close to the boys throughout their lives, and were reportedly thought of as surrogate grandmothers.

During the 1950s Matter and Durrleman gradually reduced their work at the hospital and school of nursing, jointly purchased property in Paris, and officially retired in 1956. That same year, they moved to 55 Avenue du Maine in the 14th Arrondissement of Paris.

== Death and burial ==
As Matter's health gradually declined during the mid-1970s, Durrleman arranged to have her admitted to the hospital they had co-founded. Matter died at the Ambroise-Paré Hospital in Lille on 29 May 1975. She was buried at the Montparnasse Cemetery.

Durrleman continued to reside at their Paris home until 1990 when she relocated to Châtelet, a Protestant retirement home in Meudon. Following her death there on 15 June 1993, Durrleman was buried with Matter at the Montparnasse Cemetery.

== Awards ==
Éva Durrleman, Thérèse Matter, and France Neubert were declared Righteous Among the Nations by Yad Vashem on 29 November 1990.

In September 2017, a plaque honoring the trio was placed in Lille by Yad Vashem.

== See also ==
- Lille during World War II
