= Vollant =

Vollant is a French surname. Notable people with the surname include:

- Simon Vollant (1622–1694), French engineer, entrepreneur, and architect
- Florent Vollant (born 1959), Canadian singer-songwriter
- Stanley Vollant (born 1965), Canadian surgeon
