= Simon Vollant =

French engineer, entrepreneur and architect (1622-1694)

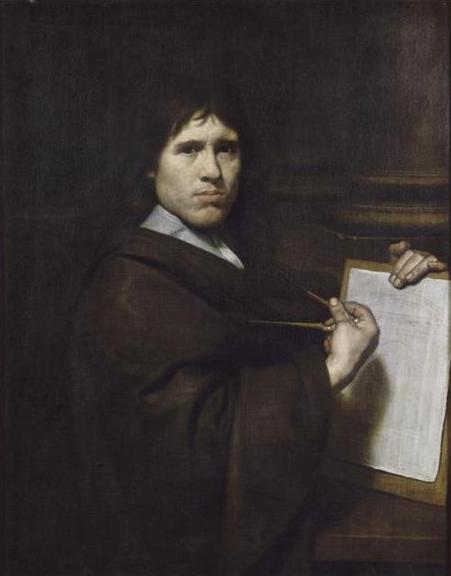
Simon Vollant, with his architectural compass, probably in front of one of his projects for the Porte de Paris in Lille.

Simon Vollant (1 February 1622 – 1694) was a 17th-century French engineer, entrepreneur and architect ennobled in 1685.

Vollant built the citadel of Lille and became the most renowned fortifications builder for Vauban, Louvois and Louis XIV. He directed or controlled the principal works of fortifications of the cities, inspected the various fortresses of the north of the country and advised the generals.

As a civil architect, he built the Porte de Paris in Lille, considered by some to be a masterpiece. He drew the plans of the new district Saint-André de Lille. His advice was sought and followed for the channelling works of the Deûle and to bring the waters of the Eure to Versailles. He also designed and built hôtels particuliers, houses like those in Rang de Beauregard, various buildings and squares.

== Biography ==
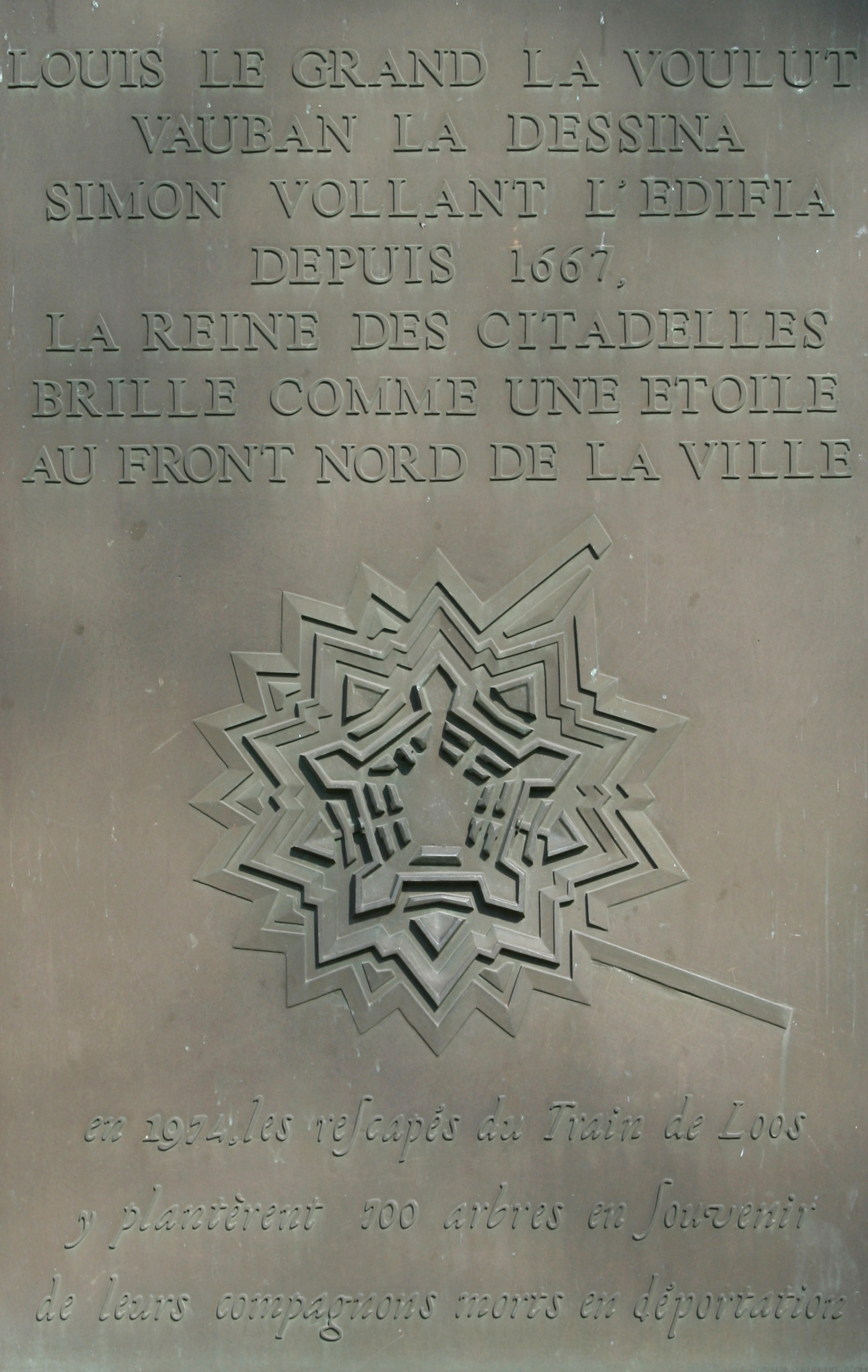
Simon Vollant l'édifia: Plaque on the citadel of Lille.

Vollant came from an old Lille family of entrepreneurs and architects, then called "master masons". Born in 1622, he was the son of Jean Vollant, master mason (architect), and Jeanne Pronier and the brother of François Vollant, architect of the Église Sainte-Marie-Madeleine (Lille).

In 1646, Simon Vollant is indicated as "master mason" having several apprentices. He was dean of the master masons every year from 1648 to 1659, the year when his brother François succeeded him in this title.

=== Citadels and fortresses ===
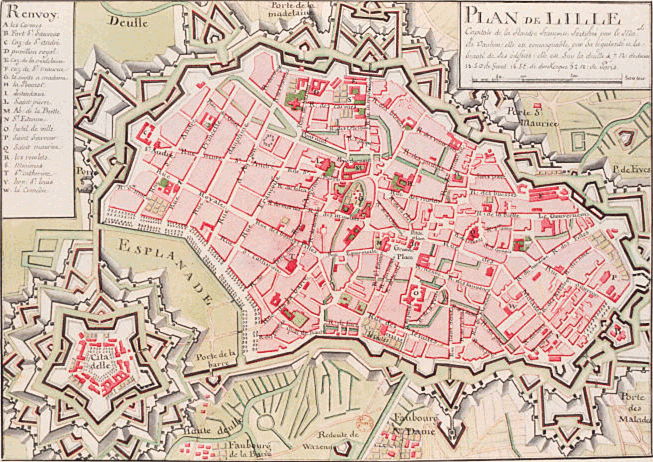
Lille fortified by Vauban and Simon Vollant.

In 1667, Vollant directed the construction site of the citadel of Lille according to the plans of Vauban. The collaboration between the two men was exemplary.

The town had to be enlarged, and Vauban imagined financing part of the fortification work by the added value realised on the land of the new district. Vollant estimated this gain at over 800,000 French livres, an estimate confirmed by the intendant. For the construction of the citadel, he employed 6,000 workers and reported to Vauban and to Louvois. On the recommendation of Marshal d'Humières, Vollant was appointed engineer to the king and ordinary architect of his armies, in reward for his services, according to a letter from Louvois of April 1668.

Simon Vollant drew the plans for the new district of Saint-André, on a very regular basis, around two main streets, the other streets being perpendicular to each other. This district, under construction from 1670, became the "Faubourg Saint-Germain" of Lille, with numerous hôtels particuliers. At the same time, he was responsible for building the new defensive wall of Lille, from 1671 to 1676, again after plans by Vauban.

During the Franco-Dutch War, Vollant's opinions were sought during the war councils preparing the strongholds attacks, and "his favourably listened opinions did not contribute little to the taking of these places", according to Louis XIV.

The king then chose Vollant to control the work on the fortified towns of Courtrai, Ath and Bergues, and inspect the towns and places of Douai, the fort of Escarpe, Audenarde, Halle, Tournai, Arras and Ypres.

Then Vollant directed the work of the fortifications of Menen, in liaison with Louvois, and to the satisfaction of the king.

=== The Porte de Paris ===
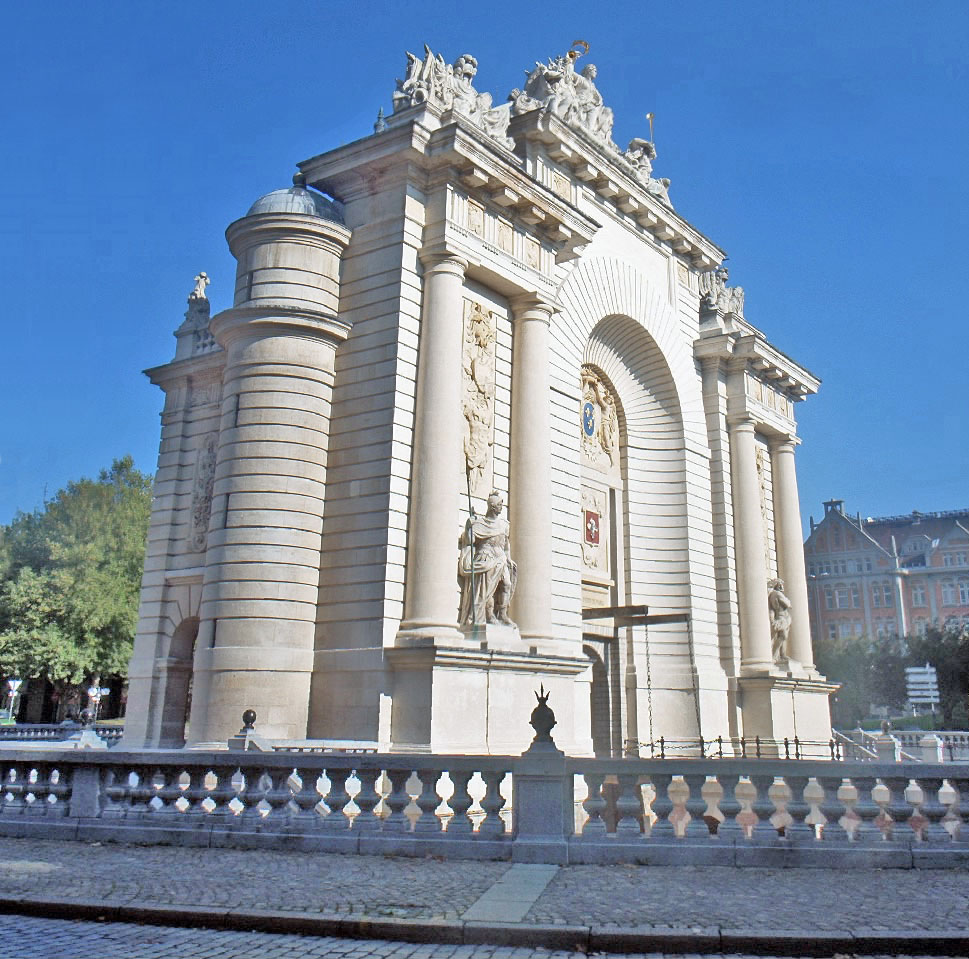
The Porte de Paris.

Vollant was also in demand for civil architecture. He determined the means of digging the canal from the Deûle to the Scarpe, and gave his opinions "approved as necessary" to bring the waters of the Eure into the palace of Versailles.

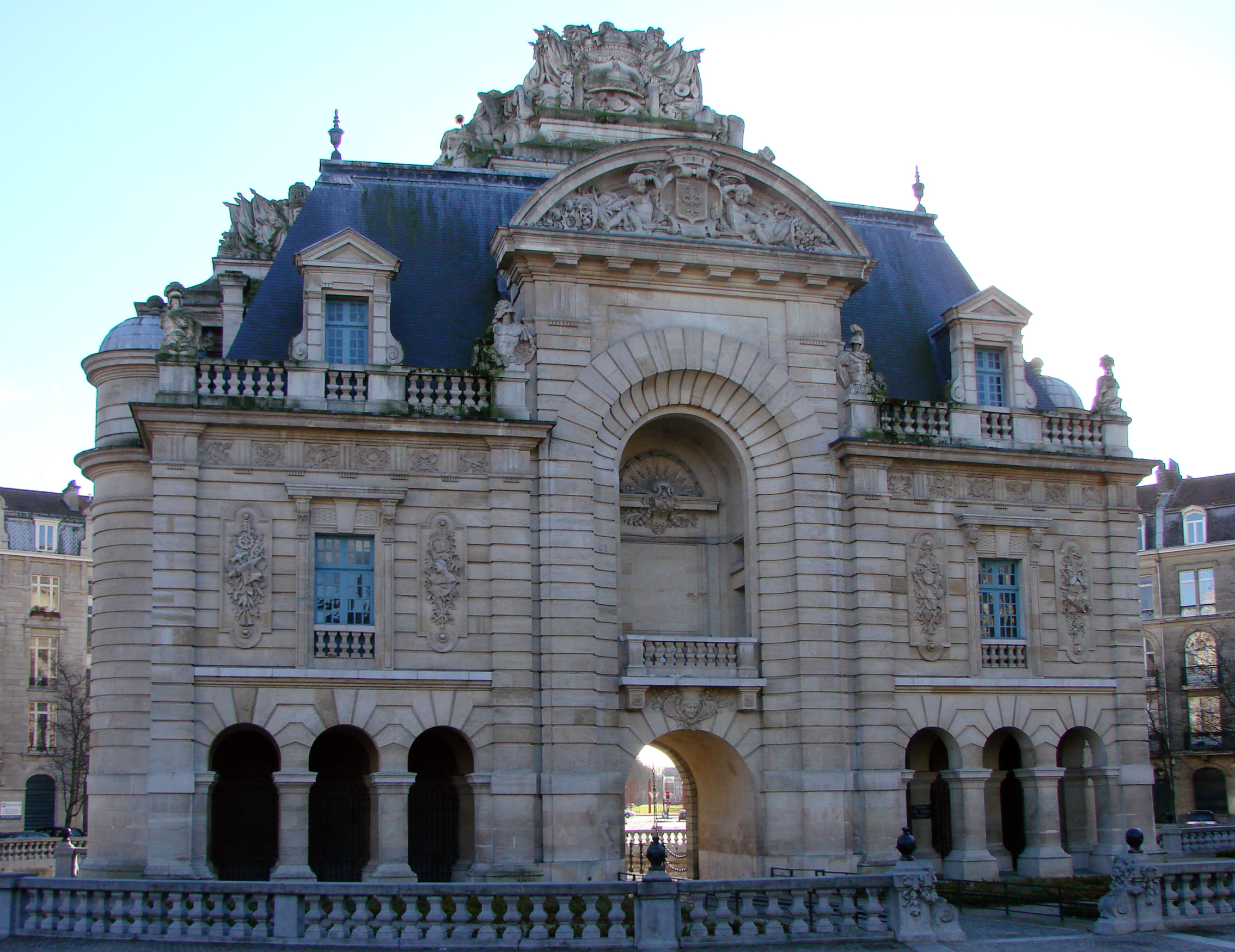
Porte de Paris, northern side

To celebrate the return to France of Lille and the Walloon Flanders, on order from Louvois and Louis XIV, Vollant transformed from 1685 to 1694 the Porte de Paris (then called the "gate of the Sick"), in triumphal arch.

The plan he made was approved in September 1684 by Louis XIV and Louvois. The work on the triumphal arch was carried out in stages, according to financial possibilities, and was not completed until about 1695, one year after Vollant's death.

The Porte de Paris thus answered more to imperatives of prestige than to any military concern. It was decorated with large doric columns, trophies and statues. But the gate itself was only a small opening following the draw-bridge, which still gave the whole a defensive role, and made it considered as "one of the last masterpieces of military history".

=== Other works ===
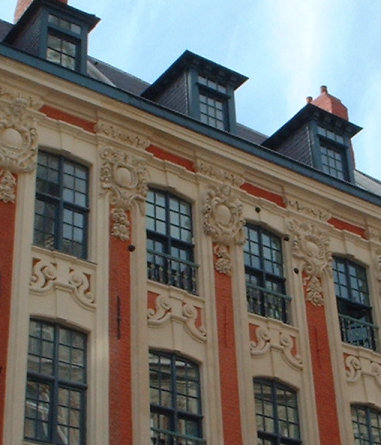
The façades of Beau regard (1687).

Vollant was also responsible for the design and construction in 1687 of the houses of the "Rang de Beauregard" (or Rang de Beau regard) on the Place du Théâtre in Lille. The harmonization imposed by the city included alignment rules, a two-storey plan with a mansarded attic and a large cellar, all built only in dimension stones and bricks. Vollant respected these rules and made a synthesis between the French classical architecture of the time and the local Flemish architecture.

He also drew the plans for the Hôtel de Métilly, rue du Gros-Gérard, which was completed in 1695, one year after his death.

He was also appointed Grand Argentier (treasurer) of Lille from 1671, which displeased Lille residents who considered it abnormal that their treasurer was at the same time, by his status as director of fortifications or contractor, one of the main spenders. He was then prosecutor of the Magistrate of Lille, from 1684.

Some authors also attribute to Vollant the beginning of the construction of the Pont-Neuf de Lille completed in 1701 and of various later works, the general hospital, the Palace of Justice and the Archives, which would rather be attributed to his sons, having been built and completed after his death.

=== Coat of arms ===
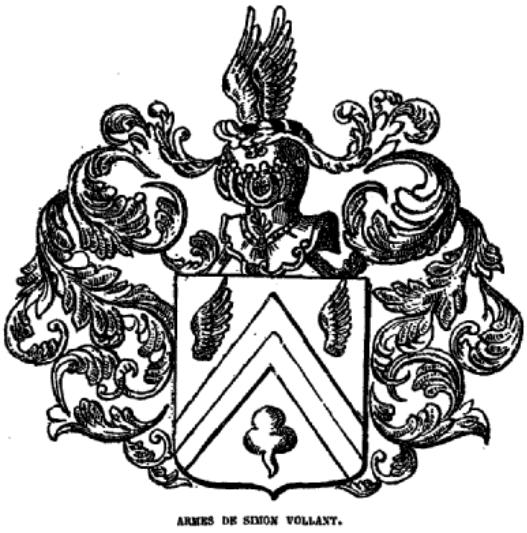
Vollant's Coat of Arms

He was ennobled in 1685. The rules of heraldry accompanying his letters of nobility attributed to him the arms

d'azur à un chevron d'or, accompagné en chef de demi-vols d'argent, et en pointe de trèfle du même.

This were canting arms with the semi-vols for "Vollant".

=== Family ===
Vollant married Marie Villain, originally from Tournai, daughter of André Villain, dean of the master masons (architects) of Tournai.

- Their children were:
  - François Pasquier Vollant, received as master mason (architect) in 1656.
  - Jean François Vollant, received like his brother as master mason in 1656.
  - Jean Vollant.
  - Marie-Catherine Vollant, wife of Charles de Valori (1658–1734), lieutenant général and combat engineer.
  - Marie-Jeanne Vollant.

Vollant married Marguerite-Félicité Haccou for a second marriage.

== Homages ==
- Ennoblement in 1685.
- Plaque on the citadel of Lille: Louis le Grand la voulut / Vauban la dessina / Simon Vollant l'édifia.
- Place Simon-Vollant, in Lille, place where is located the Gate of Paris that he built.
- Rue Simon-Vollant in Lambersart.

== Notes and references ==
- L. Quarré-Reybourbon, La porte de Paris, à Lille, et Simon Vollant son architecte, Paris, Plon, 1891 Read online
- Other references and notes

=== Bibliography ===
- L. Quarré-Reybourbon, La porte de Paris, à Lille, et Simon Vollant son architecte, Paris, Plon, 1891 Read online.
- Francastel, Pierre (1959). Les architectes célèbres (in French). Vol. 2. Paris: Lucien Mazenod. p. 272. Francastel1959..
- Charles Bauchal [in French] (1887). Nouveau dictionnaire biographique et critique des architectes français (in French). Paris: Librairie générale de l'architecture André et Daly fils. p. 593. Bauchal1887..
- Réunion des sociétés des beaux-arts des départements (in French). Vol. 27. Paris: Ministère de l'éducation nationale, Direction générale des beaux-arts. 1903. p. 305. Read online.
- Louis de Grandmaison, Essai d'armorial des artistes français. Lettres de noblesse. Preuves pour l'ordre de Saint-Michel, p. 305, Réunion des sociétés savantes des départements à la Sorbonne. Section des beaux-arts. Ministère de l'instruction publique, 1903, 27th session Read online

=== External links ===
- Simon Vollant on Structurae
