= Seclin =

- Commune
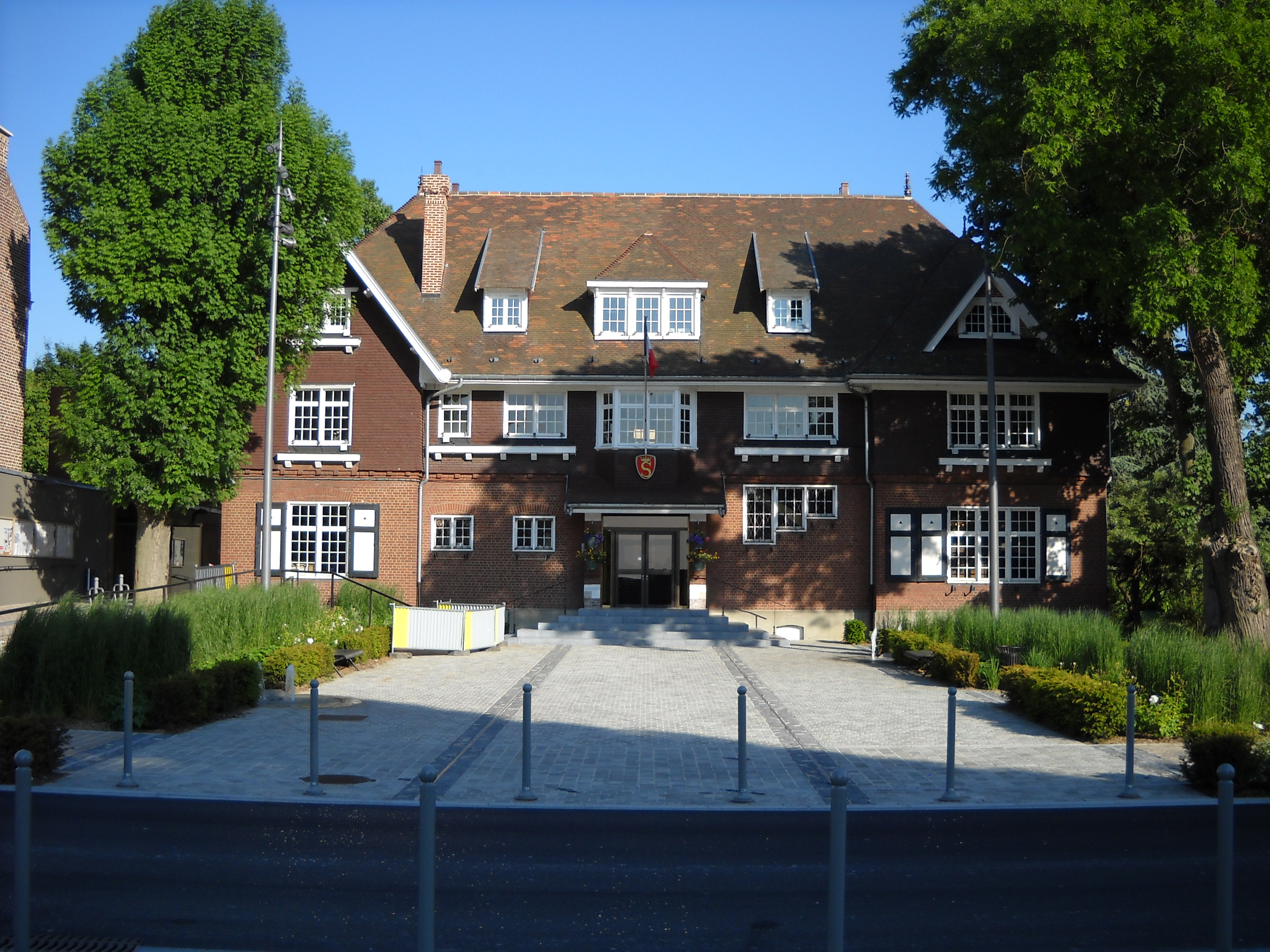
- Seclin Town Hall

- Coat of arms
- Location of Seclin
- Location within France Location within Hauts-de-France
- Coordinates: 50°32′56″N 3°01′49″E
- Country: France
- Region: Hauts-de-France
- Department: Nord
- Arrondissement: Lille
- Canton: Faches-Thumesnil
- Intercommunality: Métropole Européenne de Lille

Government
  - Mayor (2020–2026): François-Xavier Cadart
- Area^{1}: 17.42 km^{2} (6.73 sq mi)
- Elevation: 34 m (112 ft)
- Highest elevation: 47 m (154 ft)
- Lowest elevation: 19 m (62 ft)
- Population (2023): 13,261
  - Density: 761.3/km^{2} (1,972/sq mi)
- Time zone: UTC+01:00 (CET)
  - Summer (DST): UTC+02:00 (CEST)
- INSEE/Postal code: 59560 /59113
- ^{1} French Land Register data, which excludes lakes, ponds, glaciers > 1 km^{2} (0.386 sq mi or 247 acres) and river estuaries.

Seclin (French pronunciation: [səklɛ̃]) is a commune in the Nord department in northern France. It is part of the Métropole Européenne de Lille.

== Population ==
Historical population
Year	Pop.	±% p.a.
1968	9,372	—
1975	9,924	+0.82%
1982	13,056	+4.00%
1990	12,281	−0.76%
1999	12,089	−0.17%
2007	12,219	+0.13%
2012	12,479	+0.42%
2017	12,414	−0.10%
2023	13,261	+1.11%
Source: INSEE

== Notable residents ==
- Adrien Fourmaux, rally driver
- André Ayew, Ghana national football team footballer
- Sébastien Enjolras, racing driver
- Victor Mollet, architect
- Jonathan Rousselle, basketball player
- Steeven Willems, Footballer

== International relations ==
Seclin is twinned with:

- Apolda, Germany
- Larkhall, Scotland, United Kingdom
- Meguet, Burkina Faso
- Zabrze, Poland

== See also ==
- Communes of the Nord department
