= Victor Mollet =

French architect and teacher

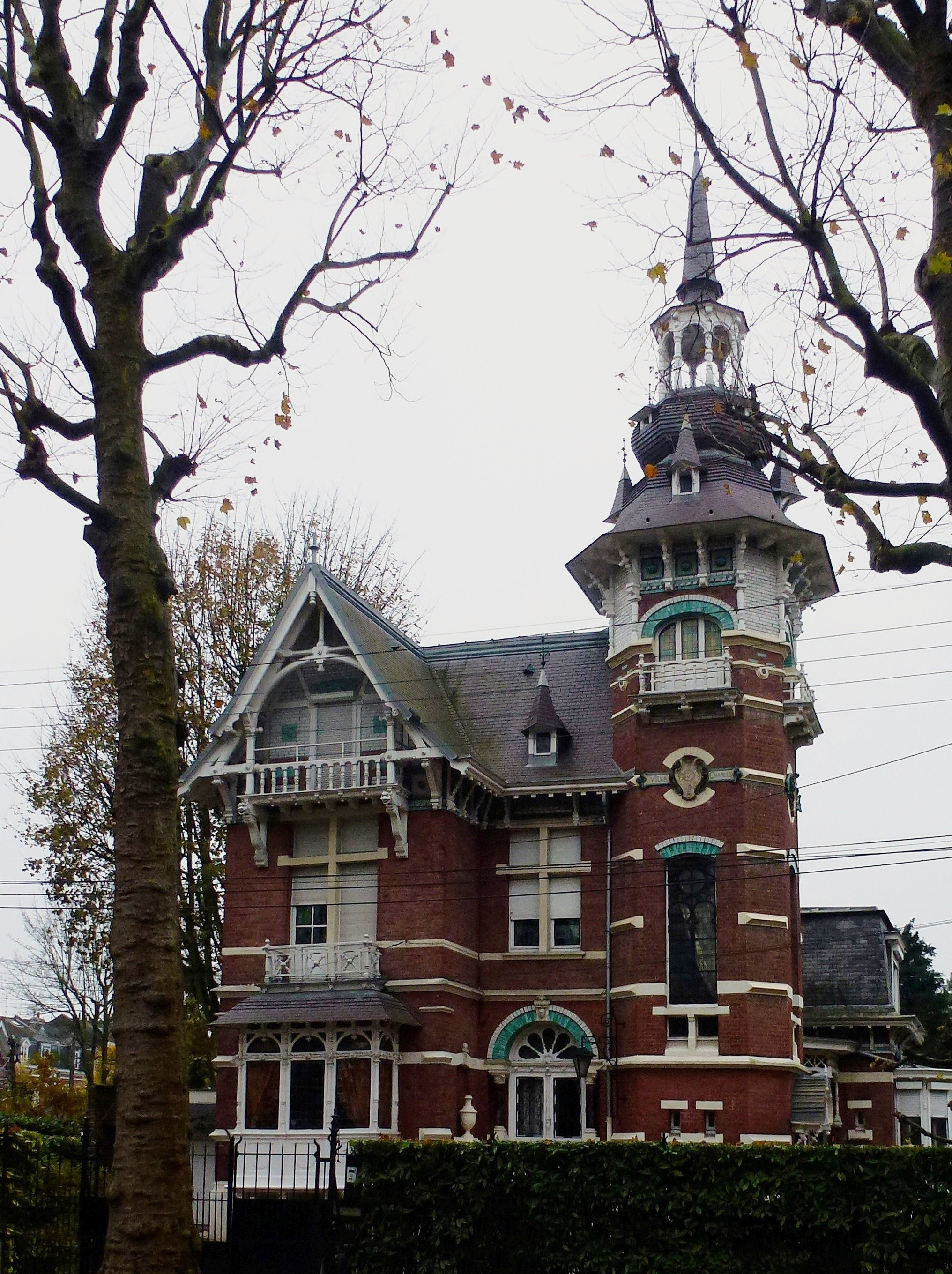
- Born: 22 August 1860; Seclin, France
- Died: 17 December 1944 (aged 84); Lille, France
- Occupation: Architect
- Buildings: Villa St-Charles; City Hall of Seclin; Seclin Fire Station; Villa Boidin; Maison Dujardin

Victor Jean-Baptiste Mollet (22 August 1860 – 17 December 1944), usually simply Victor Mollet, was a French architect based in Lille. He was the first architect from the Nord–Pas-de-Calais region to receive a degree from the Ecole des Beaux-Arts in Paris, and became one of the more prominent exponents of regionalist architecture in northern France at the turn of the twentieth century.

== Life and career ==
Mollet matriculated first to the local Ecole des Beaux-Arts in Lille, where he was a student of Alfred Newnham, before entering the Ecole Nationale des Beaux-Arts in Paris in 1884. He studied with Louis-Jules André, and then his successor Victor Laloux, receiving his degree (diplôme) on 22 January 1891. That same year, Mollet participated in the Salon des artists français in Paris, exhibiting a country house ("Maison de campagne"), which won an honorable mention in the architecture section.

Mollet began practice in Lille and was the first architect in the region Nord-Pas-de-Calais to have received a diploma from the Ecole in Paris. He also became chief of the architecture studio at the Ecole régionale de Lille.

In 1896, he was designated as the architect in charge of the repairs to the Palais des Beaux-Arts de Lille, then was named the official architect for the structure in 1912.

His most famous work is the Villa Saint-Charles in Lambersart, just outside Lille, an eclectic, regionalist mansion constructed between 1892 and 1894 for his father, Charles Mollet, a successful master carpenter and entrepreneur in Seclin. Since 2000, the villa has been classified as an official French Monument historique.

In the 1930s, he was commissioned with his son Louis Mollet to construct the atrium of the Palais des Beaux-Arts in Lille. Victor Mollet was very attached to his hometown of Seclin, where he built many houses for rich industrialists such as the Dujardin, Guillemaud, and Duriez families.

He was the brother of Marie-Virginie Duhem, who was the Doyenne des Français (oldest woman in France) from 1975 to 1978 and the oldest living person on earth for five months.

== Major works ==
- Villa Saint-Charles, Lambersart (1892–94)
- 16 boulevard Carnot, Lille (ca. 1910)
- La Chapelle Saint Piat, Seclin
- Seclin Fire Station
- Villa-chateau of Auguste Boidin, 68 rue Bouvry, Seclin
- House at 31 rue de Burgault, Seclin
- City Hall, Seclin
- War Memorial, Seclin (1923)
- Restoration of the Église Saint-Vincent, Marcq-en-Barœul (1931)
- Maison Dujardin, Seclin
- House at 10 rue des Poissonceaux, Lille, Seat of Lille's Agency, charged with the promotion and marketing of the Lille metropolitan area
