= Lille during World War II =

Events in the city of Lille, France during World War II

In 1940, following the period known as the "Phoney War," Nazi Germany invaded France and occupied the city of Lille, in the Nord department of northern France, from May 31 of that year until September 4, 1944. During the occupation, the city of nearly 200,000 was incorporated into Belgium under a single occupation authority.

== Military operations ==
=== Invasion ===
On the night of May 9–10, 1940, German armored vehicles crossed the Ardennes to the southeast. German bombers focused their attacks on strategic points, such as the railway line in the Lille suburb of Lambersart. The German army advanced rapidly, occupying Luxembourg and Belgium before eventually reaching Lille on May 27. After three panzer divisions attacked from west of the Deûle river, French and British soldiers withdrew from the city, leaving only a few pioneer regiment units, eighty administrative clerks, and a thousand Senegalese soldiers entrenched in the Citadel of Lille. Though otherwise ill-equipped, the Senegalese regiment's armored vehicles allowed them to resist the siege for four days.

To prevent strategic resources from falling into German hands, the British destroyed the Boitelle telephone center and burned a stockpile of military equipment that could not be escorted to the zone libre in time. On the morning of May 28, German patrols defeated pockets of resistance around the Rue Solférino, the Rue Nationale, and the Haute-Deûle. Field headquarters were set up in the Place du Général-de-Gaulle, also known as the Grand'Place. On May 31, the last remaining resistance on the Avenue de Dunkerque in Lambersart and in the Citadel laid down their arms.

The Battle of Lille officially ended on June 1, when French soldiers were marched through the city streets and the Grand'Place. The final death toll was 174, including 15 civilians, 128 French soldiers, one British soldier, and 30 German soldiers. Two bridges and two hundred and twenty buildings were destroyed, including the Place de Tourcoing and the buildings surrounding the Porte de Béthune.

=== Bombings ===
The city center of Lille was largely left undamaged by aerial raids during the German occupation. In contrast, outlying neighborhoods endured numerous attacks. Most affected were the Lille-Fives metalworks factories (targeted eight times between 1941 and 1944), the SNCF workshops in Hellemmes, the Lille-Délivrance classification yard, the spinning mills in the Moulins neighborhood of Lille (targeted five times between 1941 and 1944), as well as the Kuhlmann chemical complexes in Loos and Marquette.

== German administrative structure ==
The German High Command in Paris had no authority over the Nord and Pas-de-Calais departments, which were instead incorporated into Belgium under the purview of the Military Administration in Belgium and Northern France, based in Brussels. Germany's intent was to weaken France by depriving it of two departments that contained numerous sources of wealth (e.g., spinning mills, steel mills, mines, and paper mills). The Military Administration's field headquarters, OFK 670, in Lille was based at the Lille Chamber of Commerce and led by General Heinrich Niehoff.

General Niehoff held full authority over Nord and Pas-de-Calais. On April 17, 1941, an order of the OFK 670 stated that "the execution of the following laws, orders, decrees, and decisions emanating from the French government has been forbidden with retroactive effect within the administrative area of the OFK 670." Fifty-six decrees were nullified following this declaration.

Within the Lille administrative area, OFK 569 handled matters such as security services, postal services, civil unrest, passive defense, prisoners, ration cards, and counter-espionage.

== Resistance ==
In Lille, acts of resistance consisted mainly of disobedience, theft, and the distribution of clandestine newspapers, such as L'Homme libre by Jean-Baptiste Lebas. The plains of the Nord département made it difficult to establish any maquis, as in the more mountainous regions. Moreover, numerous German contingents were posted to Lille. Consequently, few attempts were made to directly sabotage German installations. Out of those that were sabotaged, most were factories and railways. German soldiers and collaborators in the area were also occasionally found dead.

Three major networks operating in Lille and the greater administrative area in France were particularly active:

- "Sylvestre or Farmer": a French affiliate network created and led by Britain's Special Operations Executive agent Michael Trotobas. Destroyed 22 transformers and 12 circuit breakers in Lille-Fives, for example on June 26, 1943. Trotobas was killed by German military police on November 27, 1943.
- "OCM" (Organisation civile et militaire): a movement created in Paris in November 1940. Very active in the distribution of clandestine newspapers and the collection of intelligence, particularly military-related intelligence.
- "FTP" (Francs-Tireurs et Partisans): a network created in 1942 and run by the PCF, based in Paris and led by Jacques Duclos.

Examples of acts of sabotage:

- November 4, 1940: cables sabotaged at La Madeleine (a fine was imposed on the city government)
- The night of May 26–27, 1941: officer murdered in Lille
- January 9, 1943: Army depot in Lille attacked
- November 5, 1943: train derailed between Lille and Tourcoing

== Life under the occupation ==
=== Relations with the German occupiers ===
Between June 1940 and August–September 1944, the city's residents had very tense relations with their German occupiers. The oldest among them still bore the scars of the previous German occupation during the First World War, while the youngest were unnerved by the Nazi regime. The German authorities stepped up their efforts to maintain cordial relations with the residents of Lille, in order to facilitate plans to incorporate Nord and Pas-de-Calais into one great Flemish state. To that end, they opened canteens, lent aid to the elderly, and even offered sweets to children.

=== Rationing ===
==== Distributing provisions ====
In April 1940, Lille and five other cities in the region obtained substantial supplies of foodstuffs and clothing. Around 1,450 tonnes (1,430 long tons; 1,600 short tons) of meat were stored in the refrigerated warehouses of Lille. In May 1940, many shops began to be looted by hungry refugees. The Prefect, Fernand Carles, addressed the issue by re-opening food shops and pharmacies. The next step was to requisition and redistribute existing stocks as fairly as possible. In June 1940, Lille became the first city in France to issue ration cards (for bread, milk, coal, etc.). Each resident was sorted into a category based on their age and sex, at which point they received a ration card (carte individuelle d'alimentation) with monthly supply vouchers. A local Reprovisioning Committee (Comité de Ravitaillement) was formed on June 5, and due to its considerable efforts, Lille residents received 300 g (11 oz) of bread daily, each time in exchange for one bread voucher.

Under the occupation, supply problems were managed by the offices of the Prefecture, which had to work with the German Supply office and comply with the orders of the OFK 670. Between September and December 1940, an agency was in charge of amassing supplies of goods and regulating their commercialization, until the establishment of the General Reprovisioning Directorate (Direction du Ravitaillement Général) for the Nord département on January 1, 1941. However, the OFK 670 maintained absolute de facto control over the population's supplies.

==== Difficulties ====
The occupation authority encouraged relations with Belgium, even in the matter of supplies. Lille residents engaged in trade with their Belgian neighbors, sending food, chemical products, pharmaceuticals, coal, and more. Fraudulent activity was common, which harmed the interests of the General Directorate. The black market covered up to 60% of the city's needs, but also lead to food inflation. Such illicit trafficking of goods was severely punished by the authorities.

There were special rules and restrictions in place:

- More than 1,000 establishments in Lille selling alcoholic beverages were subject to certain rules (e.g., the sale of alcohol was strictly forbidden three days out of the week, and every such establishment had to close at a certain hour).
- Article 1 of the Order of May 2, 1941 set forth regulations on restaurants. A la carte service was forbidden, meat portions were limited, and fresh bread was not allowed to be served, among other restrictions.
- Business cafeterias that received either "normal" or "privileged" levels of food supplies (e.g., cafeterias in metalworks plants working on the Atlantic Wall) were under the control of the OFK 670 in 1941.

Weekly markets in Lille (such as those selling fruits, vegetables, and meats) saw a major drop in customers during the war, a situation that only worsened under the occupation, as all products required a voucher. Fish sellers in the Wazemmes neighborhood and on the Rue Solférino had the most success. Lines grew long in front of grocery stores and food shops.

Many bakeries were closed down or looted. The largest bread factory and flour mill in France during the interwar period was the Indépendante, which supplied many cities in the region. Consequently, it drew the Germans' interest the moment they arrived in Lille, resulting in German military personnel being posted there.

Sugar was more readily available in Lille than in some other regions of the country, but supplies of meat remained scarce. Hunting permits were issued by a department of the OFK 670 in Lille, led by Chief Inspector Estorff, a friend of Marshall Göring.

Wine was rationed, leading to significant levels of wine trafficking that even the Germans themselves contributed to. Coal, leather, oil, and metals were also frequently in short supply.

=== Recreation and culture ===
==== Recreational life continues ====
Cultural consumption in Lille continued apace, likely due to a general desire to be distracted from current events. Performances were sometimes interrupted by air raid sirens or blackouts. In movie theaters, Nazi propaganda and German news reports frequently preceded film screenings. The Théâtre Sébastopol was often full, though the Germans paid little attention to it, caring only that theatergoers complied with the rules. Although the French were allowed to attend German performances, such as at the Opéra starting in 1941, they rarely did so. On May 10, 1941, the "Deutsche Theater" was unveiled, with the goal of turning the Opéra de Lille into a veritable German cultural space. It would be the site of many performances, including operas, plays, ballets, and concerts. Exhibitions in Lille were still common, and their topics were often in alignment with Nazi propaganda (e.g., "Bolshevism against Europe" in June 1942).

The most active sports associations in Lille were association football, cycling, rowing (Lille's oldest sports club), and track and field. Flandre-Lille, a football team well known for its high level of play, finished second in the 1944 French Championship. In November 1944, the Lille Olympiqe Sporting Club was formed from the merger of two other association football clubs. Three Paris–Roubaix cycling events took place during the war.

There were numerous community gardens in Lille during the occupation.

=== Restrictions on cultural activities ===
On September 8, 1939, the Bibliothèque Municipale was closed to the public, its collections periodically transferred to other regions.

The Germans imposed a number of restrictions on recreational life and cultural activities in Lille. Jewish pieces were not allowed to be played at concerts, and English-language films were banned in 1940. Dancing in public places was outlawed on August 20, 1940; however, dancing was allowed in certain schools, which had to comply with strict rules imposed by the Germans. Sign-up fees were often high, so residents from poorer backgrounds would make do by attending secret dances, at the risk of being fined.

Published works were not allowed to "harm German prestige and interests," according to one rule on book publishing. The physical quality of books worsened during the war, owing to a shortage of paper.

=== Medical and social assistance ===
The national government was slow to act, so private organizations—including the ACO (Catholic Action for Workers), the LOC (League of Christian Workers), and the Social Secretariat of Lille—handled the distribution of emergency relief to the families of the men away at war. Those families who were most in need were given money.

The first soup kitchens in Lille were set up in November 1940. Low-cost restaurants were set up in 1941, along with school cafeterias. Heated shelters, open every afternoon except Sundays, were also established in Lille. They had readings rooms, nurses, sewing machines, and more. Finally, the organization National Relief (Secours National) focused its relief efforts on aid to bombing victims, and also engaged in rescue operations.

==== Relief organizations ====
On June 4, 1940, the SSBM (Society for Relief to Wounded Soldiers), UFF (Union of French Women), and ADF (Association of French Ladies) merged to form the French Red Cross. The Committee of the French Red Cross in Lille engaged in a variety of activities, such as opening two clinics and offering training for nurses. Numerous volunteers worked for the Red Cross, and most of the committee's resources were devoted to aiding the suffering (particularly prisoners in Loos, as well as the wounded, the sick, undernourished children, etc.). In April 1942, the Youth Red Cross was formed.

In the first year of the war, the "Dames," female volunteers trained in healthcare, managed the train station cafeteria reserved for soldiers on leave, while also helping with various other day-to-day tasks (notable examples include Marie-Rose Dalmar and Elisabeth Biarez). They were very active during the occupation and cared for numerous patients.

First-aid workers were also very active, particularly following the 1942 bombings of Fives and Helemmes. During this period, under the stewardship of Maurice Defives, Lille was the best-organized city when it came to first aid, with 260 first-aid responders in 1943. The job was not without its dangers, however, as demonstrated when four aid workers were gunned down by the SS in 1944.

The existence of German organizations such as the NSV (Socialist National Assistance, or "New Society of Vandals" according to the locals), established in 1940, as well as a group of German nurses known as Schwestern ("sisters"), attests to the Nazi Party's desire to show goodwill to the French, with the goal of reconciling their two peoples. However, these organizations ceased operations in early 1941.

==== Hospitals ====
There were numerous hospitals in Lille, including the Scrive Military Hospital, which mostly cared for prisoners from Loos and victims of torture at the hands of the secret police in La Madeleine. It was completely occupied by the Germans in 1941, and in 1942 entry to the premises was forbidden. There was also Saint-Sauveur Hospital, which was originally reserved for civilians until a large influx of soldiers arrived in May 1940. The Germans abandoned Saint-Sauveur on August 30, 1944, as well as Calmette Hospital, which specialized in pulmonary conditions (particularly tuberculosis), surgery, and care for victims of gas attacks. In general, there was a shortage of healthcare workers and medicine, and a surplus of victims and patients.

== Passive defense ==
Passive defense comprised the range of measures designed to protect the civilian population from aerial bombings. The prefect of the Nord département was responsible for instituting these measures and ensuring they ran smoothly. They consisted of keeping the public informed, maintaining lookouts, concealing light sources, sounding alarms, and organizing shelters and relief efforts.

The population was kept informed using posters, the press, books, and comics. School curricula also included a 12-hour unit on passive defense in CEP classes.

The surrounding airspace was monitored by lookouts on the roofs of the hospital center(Cité Hospitalière), which was under construction at the time. Potential sightings were passed on to the Prefecture, which decided whether or not to sound the alarms. With the start of the German occupation in May 1940, Allied bombers became the focus of airspace monitoring.

French authorities, and later the German authorities, greatly emphasized the need to conceal light sources. Allied bombings frequently took place at night so that the planes could avoid being spotted. A German circular issued by General Niehoff on June 25, 1940 called on the city's residents to equip their outward-facing windows and other openings with curtains and shutters. The circular also called on residents to decrease the brightness of their lights, for example by using lampshades. It concluded by warning citizens that "any person in breach of these rules or other ad hoc prescriptions will be fined 10,000 RM or imprisoned for a period of up to one year."

The city's residents were encouraged to seek refuge in shelters during bombing attacks. The types of shelters varied; trenches, bunkers, former casemates, and cellars were used. Many cellars in Lille were modified to withstand building collapses or prevent entryways from collapsing. Support structures were added, and neighboring cellars were connected to each other. These modifications were also made to the city's former fortifications, including Portes de Béthune, Douai, and Arras.

== Repression ==
The OFK 670 regularly issued orders in reaction to strikes or acts of sabotage, or to command the population to comply with a new measure. The German military authority relied on a few different policing forces to maintain order. First there were the military services, the Feldgendarmerie (military police) and the GFP (Geheimefeldpolizei, or Secret Field Police), which initially handled matters internal to the German army before shifting focus to the resistance. There was also the Sipo-SD (commonly known as the Gestapo), the political police for the Nazi party, based in the La Madeleine suburb of Lille. The Gestapo handled all matters of a "political" nature (e.g., searching for Gaullists, communists, downed pilots, or agents sent by London). The Jewish population in Lille and the surrounding region also endured repression starting in 1942.

=== Sanctions against the civilian population ===
Numerous measures were instituted in order to ban and suppress strikes. On June 3, 1941, General Niehoff outlawed strikes and attempts to encourage strikes, under penalty of "the German authorities' most severe sanctions." On August 23, 1944, an order stated that striking workers were subject to deportation to mines in the Ruhr region and could see their pay suspended or lose their right to unemployment benefits. Two days later, a notice was posted ordering all restaurants and performances to be shut down and all civilians to stay in their homes until striking workers agreed to return to work. Those who did not comply with these orders would be summarily shot.

Starting in 1942, General Niehoff regularly issued orders requiring employees to work on Sundays.

On occasion, civilians suffered reprisals for acts committed by the Resistance, in instances where the Germans could not find the culprits. Radio receivers were confiscated, hostages were taken, and people were deported, arbitrarily arrested, or at worst, executed. For example, following the sabotage of a railway line on April 1, 1944, eighty-six civilians in the village of Ascq were executed.

=== Sanctions against political prisoners and resistance fighters ===
Over the course of the occupation, the Germans arrested people who would later be considered as "political prisoners." The Order of September 19, 1941 stated that "all political prisoners may be treated as hostages held responsible for lethal attacks by unidentified perpetrators on German soldiers, policemen, and their equivalents. For every German killed, a minimum of five hostages will be executed […]." As a result, many prisoners were executed at the Citadel of Lille, a site that would also see the executions of traitors and collaborators after the Liberation. In total, twenty-five were executed by firing squad under the occupation. Notices were posted informing the public about executions of political prisoners, saboteurs, and hostages in response to attacks or acts of sabotage against the German occupiers.

The OFK 670 issued numerous circulars limiting the freedoms of Jewish people. Beginning in July 1941, certain professions were forbidden to Jews, who also saw their radios confiscated and their possessions "aryanized." In the region as a whole, Jews were subject to curfew between 8 pm and 7 am, and a circular issued on November 14, 1941 banned Jews from entering most restaurants, pubs, bars, and cafés. Jewish deportations began in 1942. The city's residents were not always indifferent to their plight. Examples include Pastor Nick, Father Stahl, and the German military chaplain Friedrich Gunther, who was gunned down on August 26, 1944 on the steps of the OFK 670 (by one of his former superiors).

=== The liberation of Lille ===
From August 19 to 25 1944, elements of the F.F.I. in Paris, aided by General Leclerc's 2nd Armored Division, liberated the capital. On September 1, the British front lines were approaching the city of Arras.

Signs of retreat could be observed as early as August 20. German soldiers were attempting to return to Germany, and equipment stored in the Lille barracks, along with heavy tanks, began to be evacuated on September 1 via the Rue Esquermoise in the city center. The Gestapo and the GFP military police were evacuating their offices on the Rue Tenremonde and the Avenue Saint-Maur in La Madeleine. On August 31, the Germans blew up a munitions and fuel reserve depot. Despite this emerging unrest, as of September 1 the OFK 670 was still in operation, as were the tramways and the electricity and water supply services.

On the night of September 2, police cadets who were also members of the Resistance liberated the Citadel, seizing 100 crates of grenades, 1,800 rifles, and 4 heavy machine guns. By the end of morning that same day, the order was given to withdraw from Lille, and the last of the military staff were in the process of leaving the city. The French Forces of the Interior (FFI) received instructions to occupy city hall, the telephone center, and the Lille Chamber of Commerce, former headquarters of the OFK 670. That afternoon, four heavy tanks, isolated and without escort, had been left to guard the rear in the city center and were progressing down the city's main arteries (Rue Nationale, Rue Faidherbe, Rue Artois, and Rue des Postes). A unit of a dozen tanks, escorted by camouflaged cyclists, was evacuated via the Boulevard Victor Hugo while sustaining fire from members of the FFI, who were firing from behind windows in the surrounding homes.

On September 2, at 6 pm, Lille was largely liberated from the Germans and would be definitively so by the end of morning on September 4 when British tanks and armoured cars rolled through. All told, approximately 50 people were killed and 600 wounded during the liberation.

== Collaboration and purges ==
Collaborationist movements sprang up in the Nord département as early as 1940. The Vlaamsch Verbond van Frankrijk (VVF, Flemish Federation of France), established in 1940, developed a cultural and educational program designed to highlight the close cultural relationship between the Flemish and the Germans. The goal was to justify the incorporation of Lille into Belgium, with a view to rebuilding "Germanic Europe."

Other collaborationist movements were sub-sections of national political parties.

The Francist Party, founded by Marcel Bucard in 1933, was approved by the OFK 670 on October 27, 1941. Its operations focused on distributing pamphlets. The party also attempted grandiose and destructive measures against symbols of the Republic, but gradually lost steam over the course of the occupation.

The Parti Populaire Français (PPF), founded by Jacques Doriot in 1936, was approved by the OFK 670 in December 1941. As of 1942, its operations could mainly be characterized as anticommunist and "maréchaliste" (in reference to the cult of personality surrounding Marshall Pétain). The PPF regularly lacked money and activists, and was criticized for recruiting members with lengthy criminal records.

The Milice française, established by the Vichy government in 1943, was approved by Brussels on March 19, 1944. It quickly came into conflict with the other collaborationist movements (the Francist Party, the PPF, and the VVF). There were around thirty militiamen in Lille, who carried out arrests and identity checks and participated actively in the black market.

Thus, while some collaborationist movements did develop in the region, they attracted very few members, and their activities remained limited. This was possibly due to the population's fears of annexation to Germany, as well as to the traditional patriotism that characterized the Nord département.

Legal and extralegal crackdowns on collaborationists were relatively restrained. They were carried out by sub-sections of the Court of Justice operating under the authority of the Douai Court of Appeals, as well as by military tribunals. In all, 3,999 people were punished, 307 of whom were sentenced to death. The proportion of people condemned to death as compared to the total number of people given sentences was the lowest in France. Military collaboration was punished more so than political collaboration. In addition, the majority of those executed were blue-collar laborers (60%), while only 10.5% were soldiers or police officers. Other punishments included imprisonment, confiscation of property, and fines. Once again, most of those affected were laborers rather than white-collar workers, who were more easily able to obtain acquittals.

The reason so many victims of the purges came from poor backgrounds stems from the fact that a disproportionate number of collaborators were themselves of humble origin. Indeed, unemployment, poverty, and undernourishment tended to encourage collaboration. Youths also made up a large portion of those targeted by the purges, given that they accounted for around 37% of those implicated in acts of military collaboration.

One hundred and fifty-six people in the département endured extralegal crackdowns. These kinds of reprisals were already occurring as early as 1941, before the Liberation, mostly in urban areas such as Lille. Indeed, collaboration in the Nord département mainly took place in urban areas. Reprisals against collaborators mostly amounted to combat actions rather than acts of personal vengeance.

== See also ==
- German-occupied France
- Liberation of France
