= Rapid Reaction Corps – France =

HQ RRC-Fr
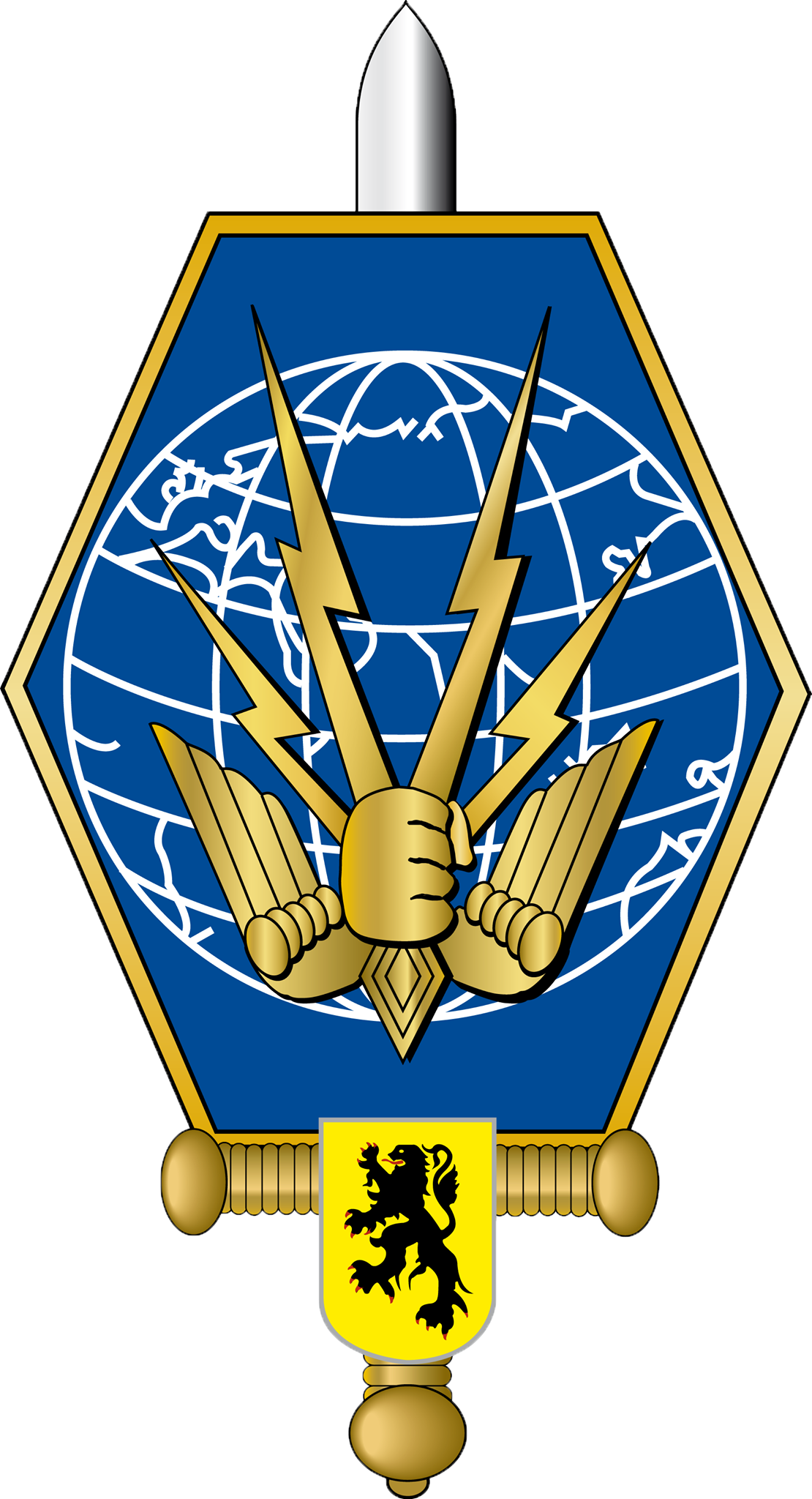
- RRC-FR insigna
- Founded: 2005 - 2025
- Country: France
- Branch: French Army
- Type: Headquarters
- Garrison/HQ: Lille
- Motto: Your operational solution
- Website: RRC-Fr

Commanders
- Current commander: Lieutenant General Benoît DESMEULLES

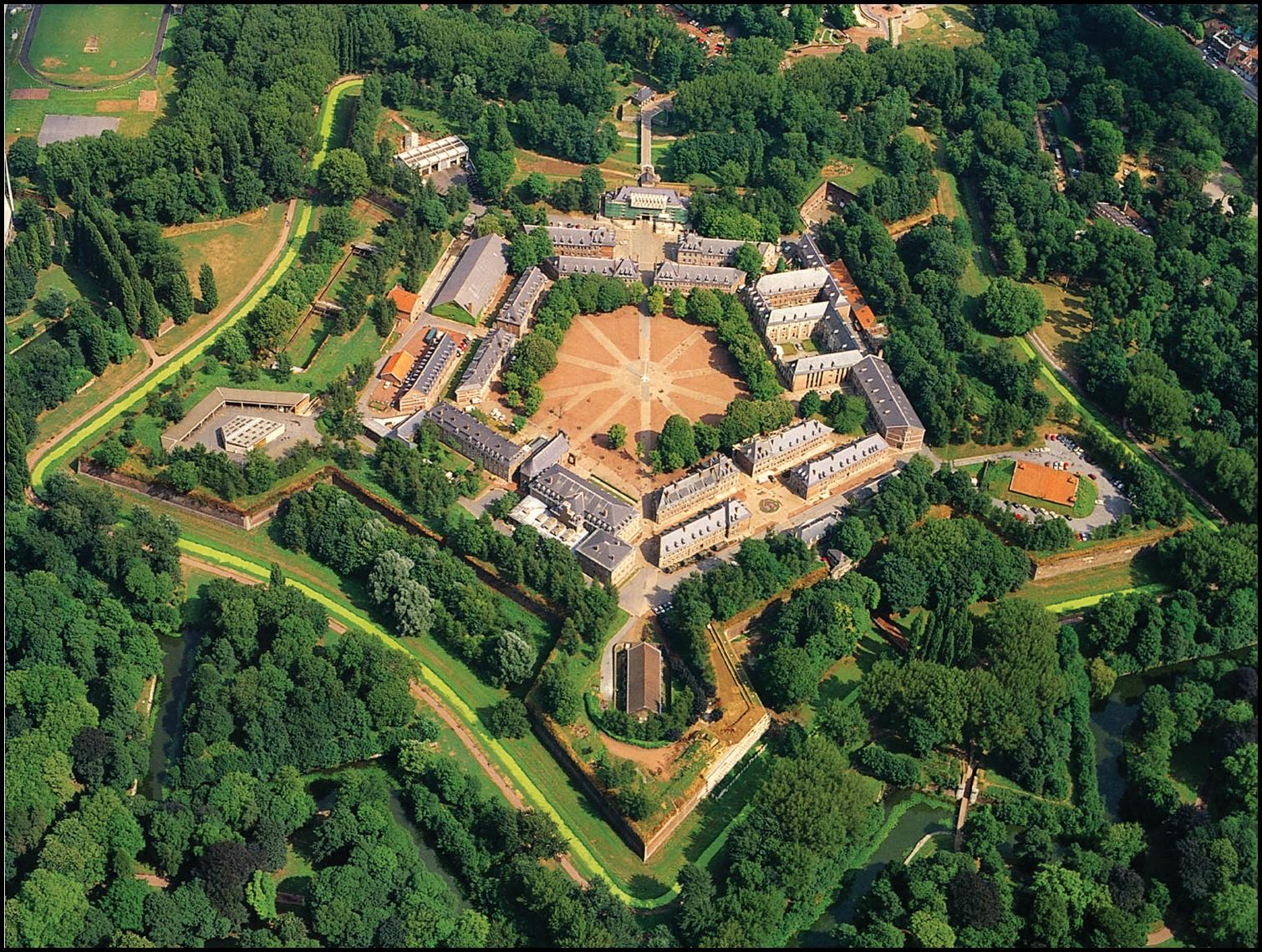
Lille's Citadelle aerial view

The Rapid Reaction Corps — France (RRC-FR) was a corps headquarters, operating under the command of the French Army's Commandement de la Force et des Opérations Terrestres (Land Forces Command). It was established on 1 July 2005 by the French Army. On 1 January 2026, the Rapid Reaction Corps – France became 1st Army Corps (France).

It was one of nine is NATO-certified corps headquarters and can command a national or multinational land component of between 60,000 and 120,000 personnel. The Corps HQ was designed to command forces under French, EU or NATO authority.

The Corps HQ was based in Lille, within the 17th-century Citadel of Lille, also known as the "Queen of the Citadels", designed by the French engineer and fortress designer Sébastien Le Prestre de Vauban

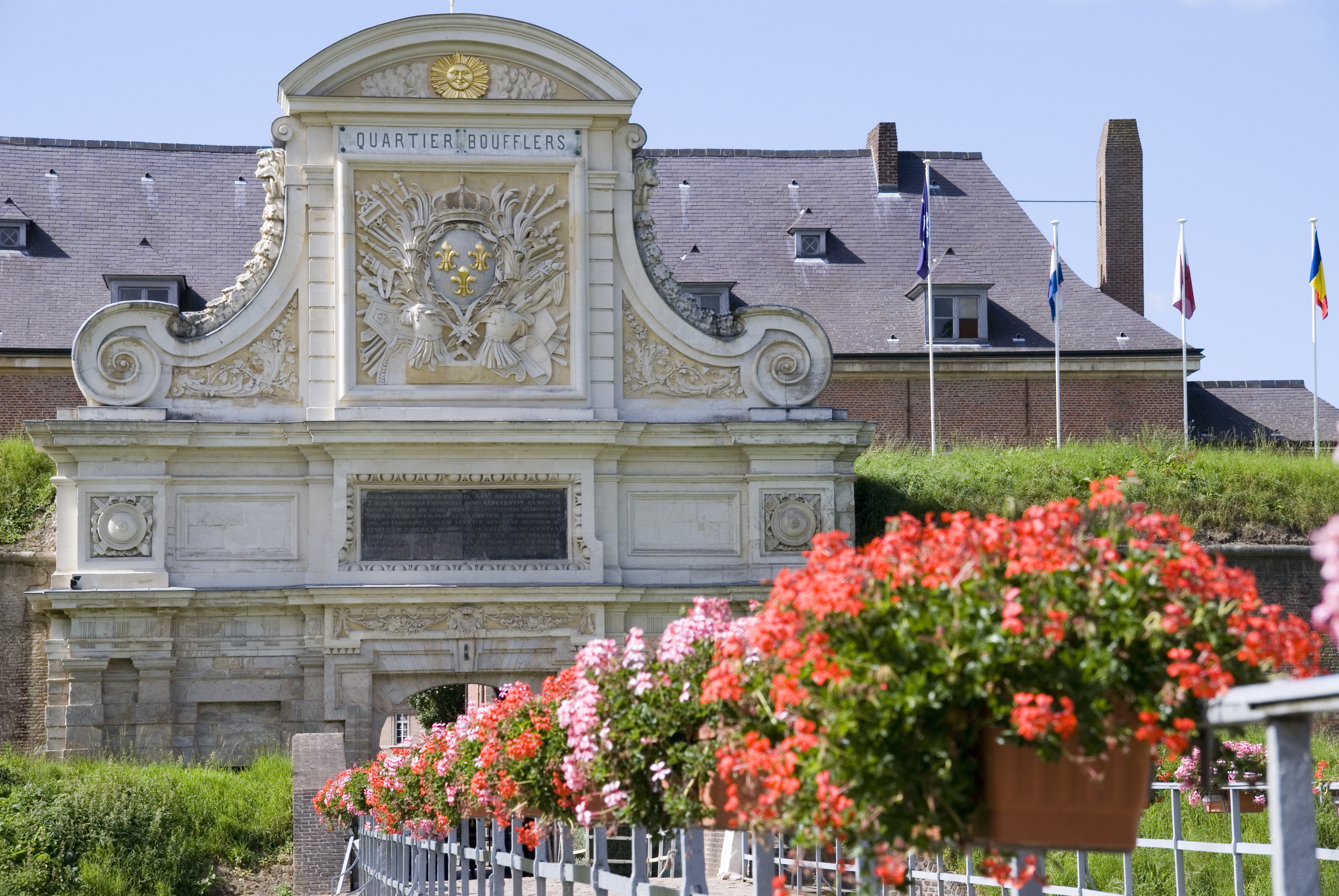
The royal gate

== History ==
The RRC-FR headquarters began forming on 1 July 2005. The RRC-FR was officially founded on 1 October 2006, in a ceremony including representatives of 22 nations, along with generals Henri Bentégeat and Bernard Thorette, then Chief of Staff of the French Army. The establishment of the RRC-FR was regarded in France as a tangible example of France’s recommitment to NATO military structures.

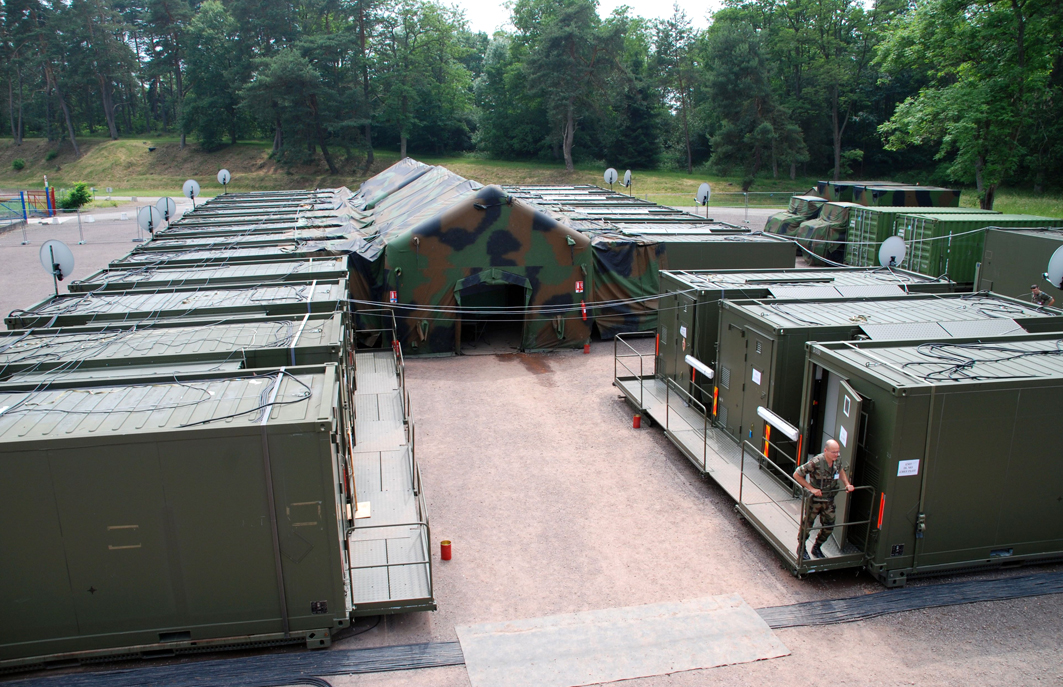
Commanding post shelters

== Operational history ==
RRC-FR has assumed the following operational commitments during its history:

- 1 July to 31 December 2008: NATO Response Force (NRF) 11 Land Component standby period.
- January to May 2009: HQ staff augmented the European Force (EUFOR) in Chad and the Central African Republic.
- August 2010 to January 2011, about 180 personnel (including about thirty allies) were deployed to Afghanistan to man part of the positions of International Security Assistance Force corps-level headquarters, the ISAF Joint Command (IJC).
- January - December 2014: NATO Response Force (NRF) Land Component standby period.
- 2015–2016: Partial HQ deployment to provide the Joint Command Post of Operation Barkhane in Africa.
- July 2017 - June 2018: NATO Joint Task Force standby period.
- March 2024: NATO Warfighting Corps (WFC) certification.

Concurrently, French personnel of RRC-FR's staff contribute to Opération Sentinelle.

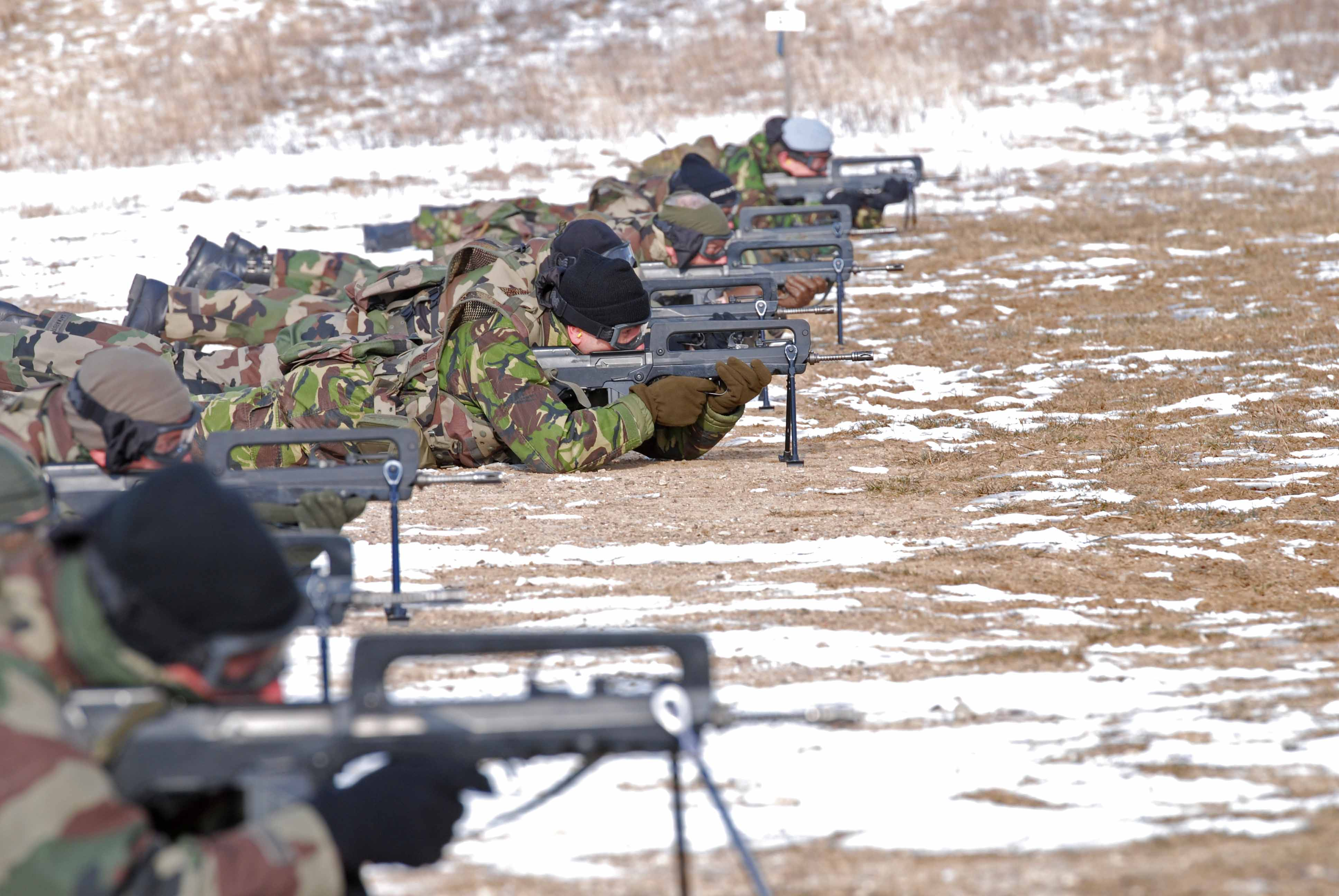
Shooting exercise

== Contributing states ==
The RRC-FR HQ is designed to command a multinational force of up to army corps size (between two and six divisions). It employs more than 400 personnel, (including 70 officers and NCOs from 12 different EU or NATO countries) and up to 750 in times of crisis. The corps HQ is open to all EU and NATO members (18% of its strength). Though stationed in France, its working language is English.

- NATO and European Union members

- Belgium
- Denmark
- France
- Germany
- Greece
- Hungary
- Italy
- Netherlands
- Romania
- Spain

- NATO members

- Albania
- Canada
- Turkey
- United Kingdom
- United States

== Commanders ==
- Lieutenant General Meille: 2005
- Lieutenant General de Kermabon: 2005–2007
- Lieutenant General Damay: 2007–2009
- Lieutenant General Fugier: 2009–2013
- Lieutenant General Margail: 2013–2016
- Lieutenant General Corbet: 2016–2018
- Lieutenant General Laurent Kolodziej: 2018–2019
- Lieutenant General Pierre Gillet: 2019–2022
- Lieutenant General Emmanuel Gaulin: 2022 - 2024
- Lieutenant General Benoît Desmeulles: since 2024

== See also ==
- Allied Rapid Reaction Corps
- NATO Response Force
- Vauban fortifications in France
