= Porte de Paris (Lille) =

City gate in Lille, France

- Porte de Paris (French)
- Interactive map of Porte de Paris
- 50.629685°N 3.068827°E
- Location: Lille, Nord, France

Site notes
- Architect: Simon Vollant

Monument historique
- Designated: 1875

The Porte de Paris, or Porte des Malades, is a city gate part of the Lille fortifications, partially built at the end of the 17th century as a triumphal arch to celebrate the victories of Louis XIV. Completed at the end of the 19th century, it was classified as a monument historique in 1875.

== History ==
The gate for the sick originally stood on this site, located on the part of the city wall built during the 13th century expansion of the city, encompassing the parishes of Saint-Sauveur and Saint-Maurice. This gate was the southern exit of the city, an extension of the street of the sick, named because it led to a leper colony or "maladrerie" in Lille, reserved for the bourgeois of Lille, founded around 1233 outside the city on the site of the current Arts and Crafts school and Saint-Sauveur station. This leper colony was closed around 1670 during the construction of Fort Saint-Sauveur.

Louis XIV showed a certain interest in the city and commissioned the architect Simon Vollant to build the Porte de Paris in front of the Porte des Malades. It was built from 1686 to 1694, in memory of the annexation of Lille to France, glorifying the entry of the "Sun King" into his "beautiful and good city" of Flanders.
