= Citadel of Lille =

Fort

Coordinates: 50°38′28″N 3°02′40″E

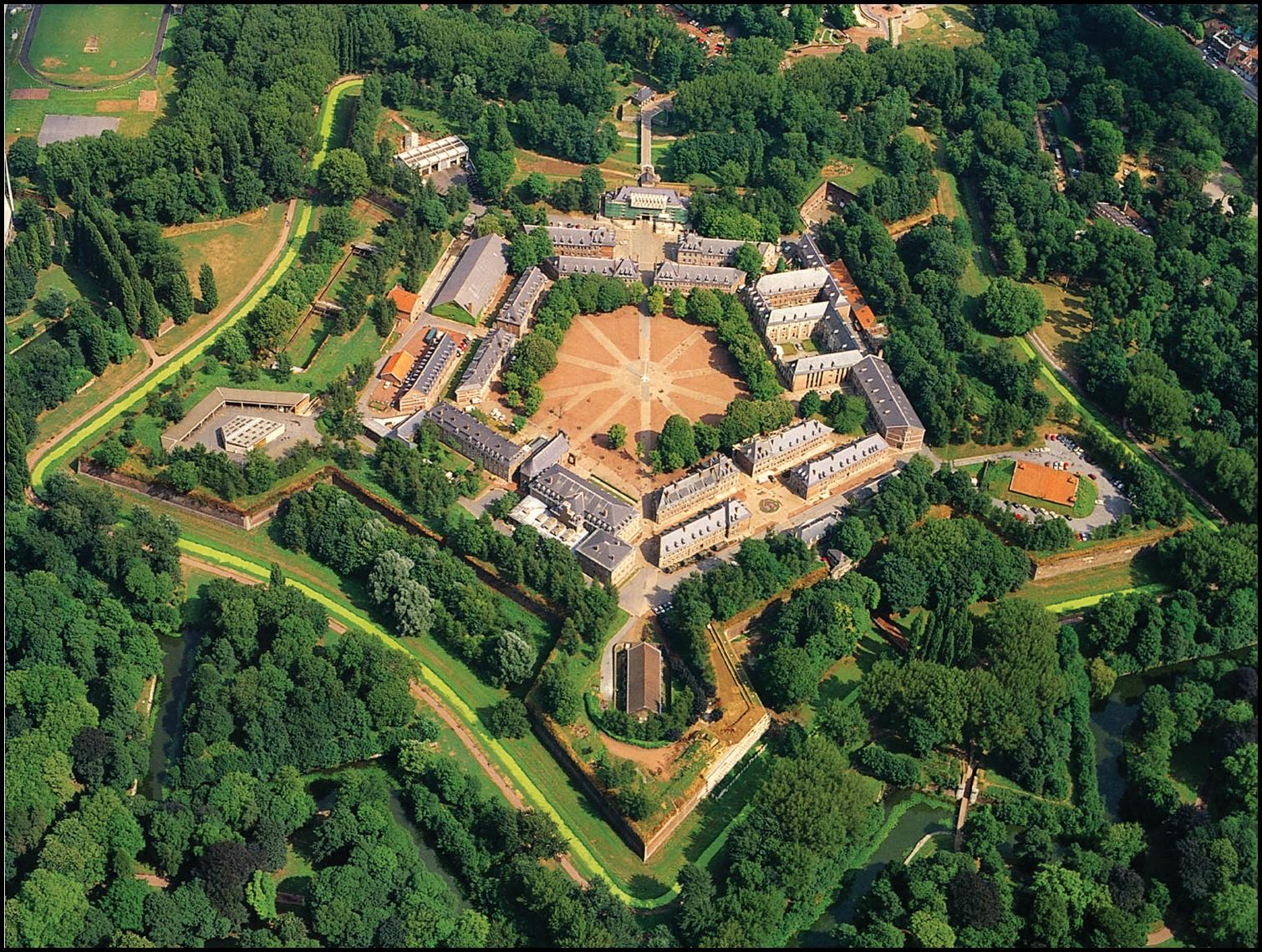
Lille's Citadelle aerial view

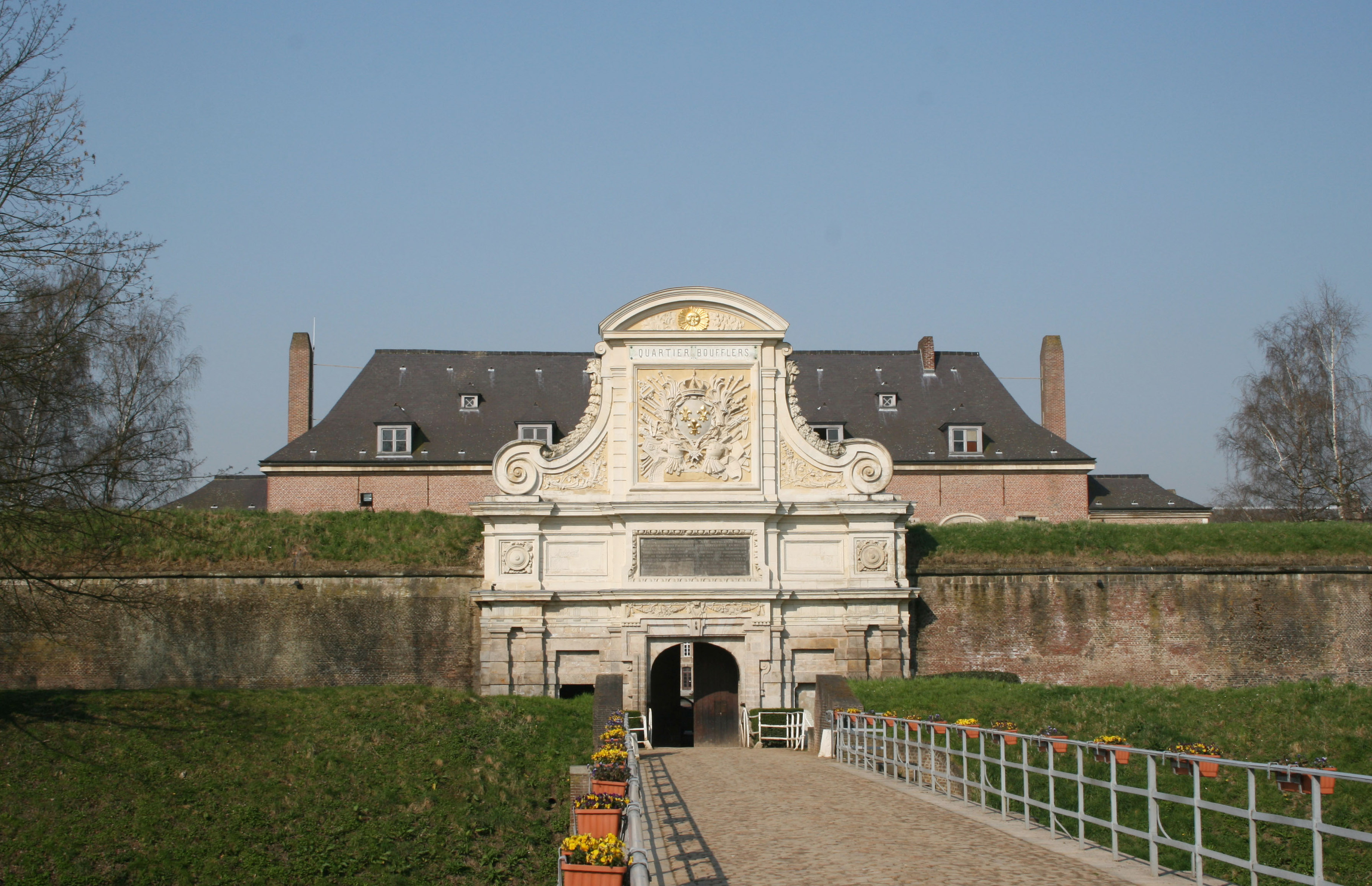
Entrance

The Citadel of Lille (French: Citadelle de Lille; Dutch: Citadel van Rijsel) is a pentagonal citadel of the city wall of Lille, in France. It was built between 1667 and 1670. It hosts the Corps de réaction rapide France.

Dubbed "Queen of the citadels" (Reine des citadelles) by Vauban, it is one of the most notable citadels designed by Vauban. It is remarkable for its size, the quality of the architecture, and the state of preservation today. Its various components have been classified as historic monuments in 1914, 1921 and 1934 respectively.

== A first-class military installation ==
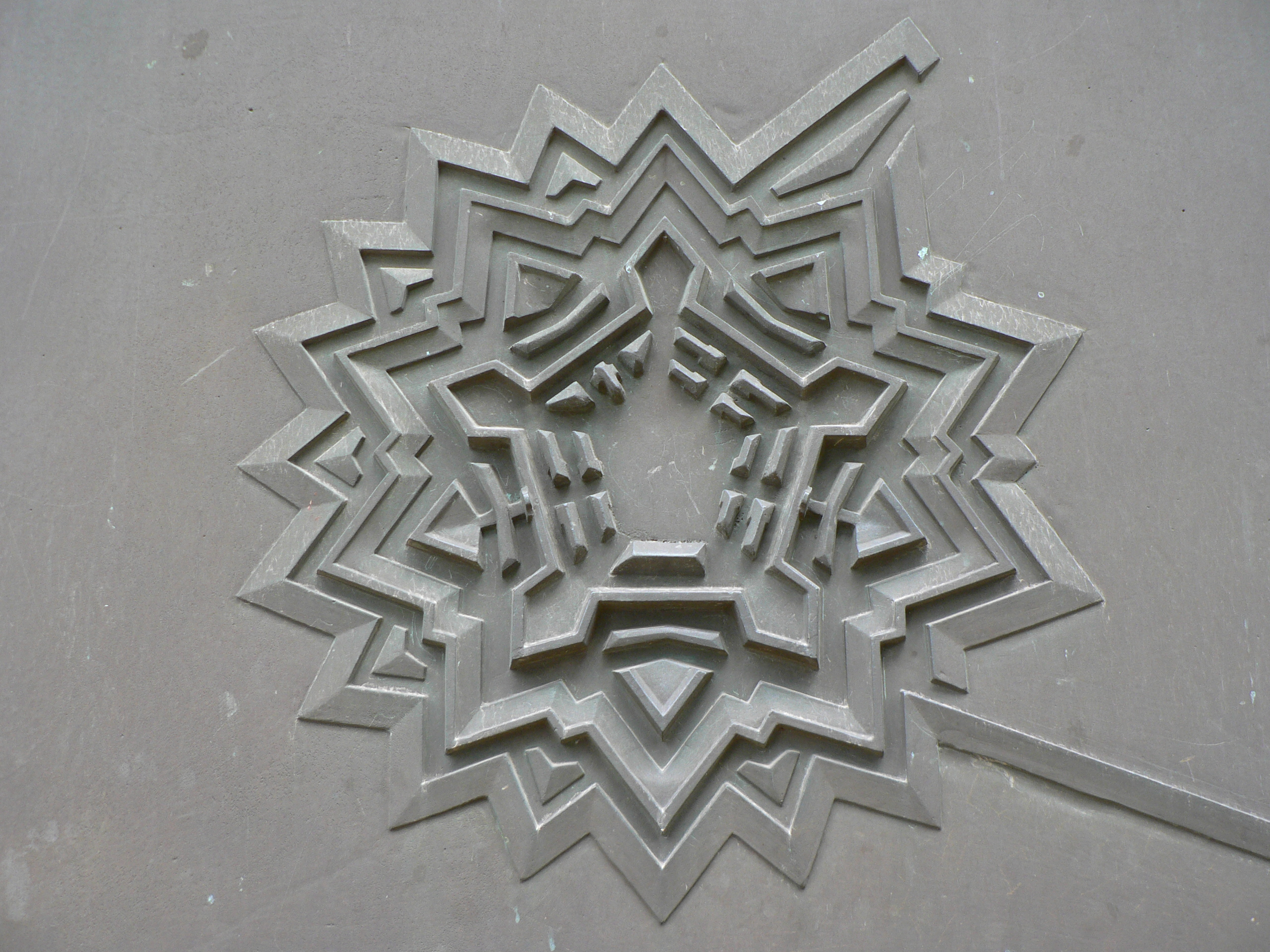
Layout of the citadel

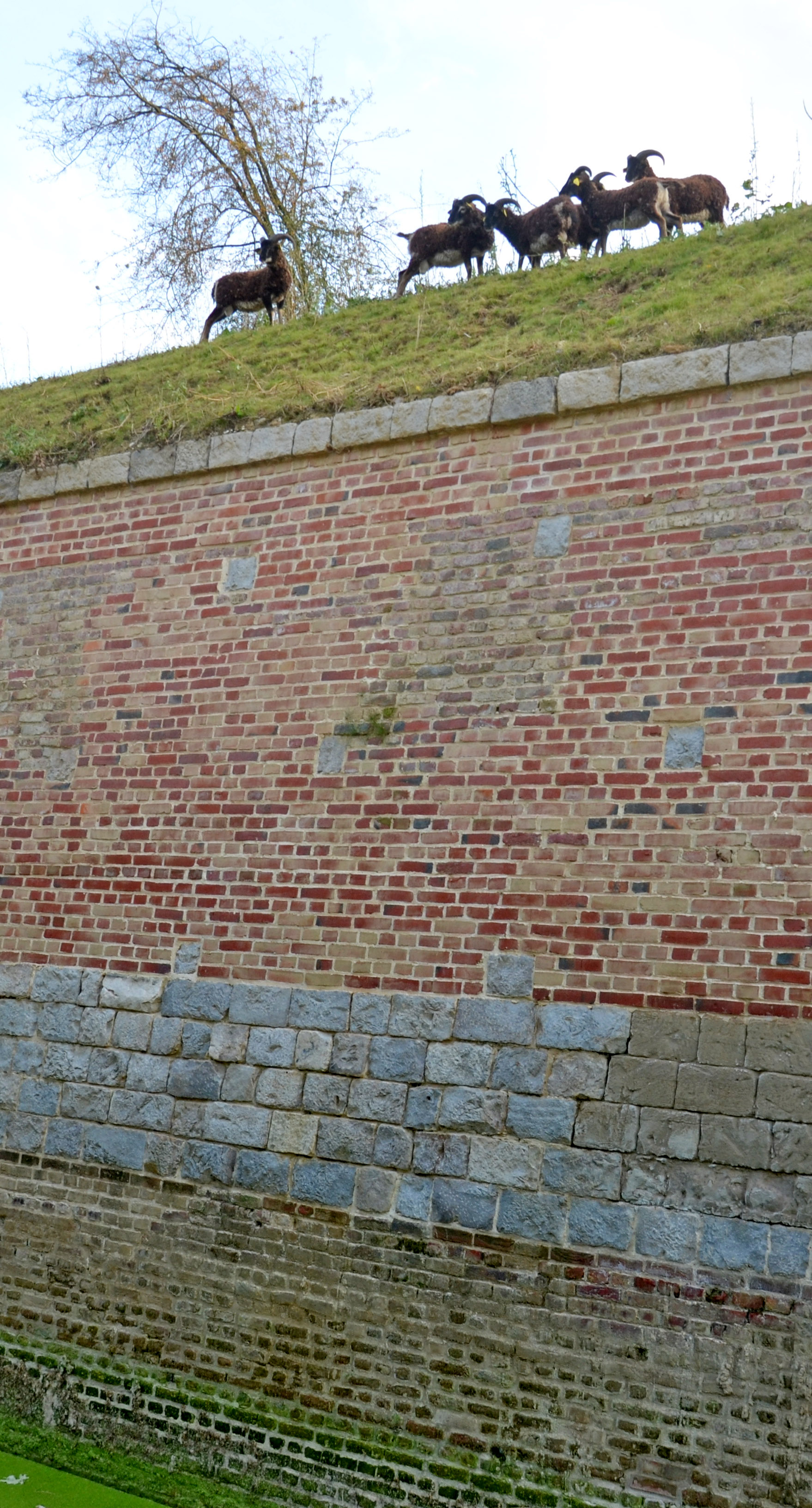
Soay sheep used by the city to crop vegetation around the fortifications. These small sheep are very comfortable on the slopes and replace the mechanical equipment otherwise required.

This "Queen of Citadels" is the matrix of most citadels designed by Vauban. Established on the border of Flanders, it was part of a double-line of fortified towns between Gravelines, Dunkirk and Maubeuge-Rocroi. It delineated the famous "Pré Carré" ("square field") conceived by Vauban comprising 28 fortified cities. From Lille, Vauban supervised the construction of the many citadels and canals of the North, which controlled the border between France and Belgium.

Lille was taken from Spain by French troops in August 1667, and Louis XIV immediately ordered the construction of a fortress. Louis Nicolas de Clerville and Vauban proposed plans. Vauban's were those chosen by the King. Work was started in 1668 under the direction of Lille's master mason, Simon Vollant. In 1671, the citadel became operational while Vauban continued to shape the city by constructing, a few steps away, a new neighborhood around the Rue Royale. The design of the citadel follows a simple but very effective idea: not one of its walls can be approached by the enemy without them being under fire from a nearby wall.

== Location ==
The citadel was constructed to the west of the city on marshland at the junction of the rivers Deûle and Bucquet. This allowed the use of swamp water and mud as a natural defense to make conditions more difficult for any possible enemy besieging the citadel. Through a system of locks and water gates, 1,700 hectares around the citadel could be flooded to a depth of 55 cm. A wide esplanade interrupted the works, connecting the fort to the city. In 1750, a canal along the esplanade was dug according to the plans drawn up by Vauban.
