= Lambersart =

- Commune
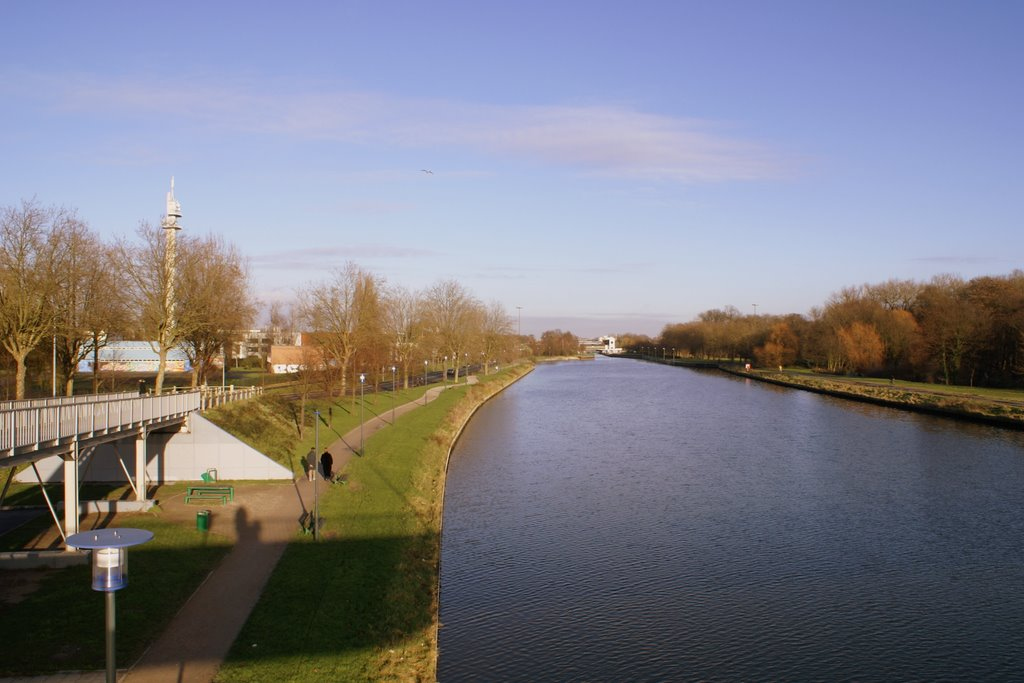
- The Deûle canal in Lambersart

- Coat of arms
- Location of Lambersart
- Location within France Location within Hauts-de-France
- Coordinates: 50°39′00″N 3°01′30″E
- Country: France
- Region: Hauts-de-France
- Department: Nord
- Arrondissement: Lille
- Canton: Lambersart
- Intercommunality: Métropole Européenne de Lille

Government
  - Mayor (2020–2026): Nicolas Bouche
- Area^{1}: 6.16 km^{2} (2.38 sq mi)
- Elevation: 25 m (82 ft)
- Highest elevation: 34 m (112 ft)
- Lowest elevation: 17 m (56 ft)
- Population (2023): 27,090
  - Density: 4,400/km^{2} (11,400/sq mi)
- Time zone: UTC+01:00 (CET)
  - Summer (DST): UTC+02:00 (CEST)
- INSEE/Postal code: 59328 /59130
- ^{1} French Land Register data, which excludes lakes, ponds, glaciers > 1 km^{2} (0.386 sq mi or 247 acres) and river estuaries.

Lambersart (French pronunciation: [lɑ̃bɛʁsaʁ]) is a commune in the Nord department in northern France.

This commune is located in the Métropole Européenne de Lille, and is a suburb of the city of Lille, bordering it on its northwest side.

Inhabitants of the town are called Lambersartois.

== Heraldry ==
Arms of Lambersart	The arms of Lambersart are blazoned : Ermine, 3 bends gules semy of escallops (bendwise) Or.

== Geography ==
Bordered by the river Deûle and the Citadel of Lille, close to Lille, Lambersart is one of the cities of the urban community Lille Métropole.

== Population ==
The population of Lambersart has reached its peak at 29,614 in 1975 and has slowly declined since then.

Historical population

Year	Pop.	±% p.a.
1793	783	—
1800	734	−0.92%
1806	856	+2.60%
1821	852	−0.03%
1831	940	+0.99%
1836	966	+0.55%
1841	1,026	+1.21%
1846	1,161	+2.50%
1851	1,219	+0.98%
1856	1,328	+1.73%
1861	1,615	+3.99%
1866	1,852	+2.78%
1872	2,240	+3.22%
1876	2,425	+2.00%
1881	2,775	+2.73%
1886	3,450	+4.45%
1891	4,050	+3.26%
1896	4,820	+3.54%
1901	6,804	+7.14%

Year	Pop.	±% p.a.
1906	7,984	+3.25%
1911	9,326	+3.16%
1921	10,472	+1.17%
1926	11,927	+2.64%
1931	14,377	+3.81%
1936	16,197	+2.41%
1946	17,675	+0.88%
1954	19,092	+0.97%
1962	21,807	+1.68%
1968	26,833	+3.52%
1975	29,614	+1.42%
1982	28,494	−0.55%
1990	28,275	−0.10%
1999	28,131	−0.06%
2007	28,410	+0.12%
2012	28,435	+0.02%
2017	27,649	−0.56%
2023	27,090	−0.34%

Source: EHESS and INSEE (1968-2023)

== Places and monuments ==
Lambersart has been an expensive residential city since the beginning of the 2000s when many regional businessmen moved to the city. The area in Deûle and the surrounding countryside has been a popular area. Urbanization as a result of increased population as a Lille suburb has resulted in the loss of open land. The architecture style which has been conserved include features such as the Touquet and Malo baths. As in common in the Nord/Pas-de-Calais Area, the red brick style is frequently found. The "Avenue de l'Hippodrome" is an avenue considered on a local scale to be the world's most beautiful avenue, with many regionalist villas for wealthy industrialists built in the early 20th century; among them is the Villa Saint-Charles by architect Victor Mollet. In Lambersart, even the small streets are often named "Avenues".

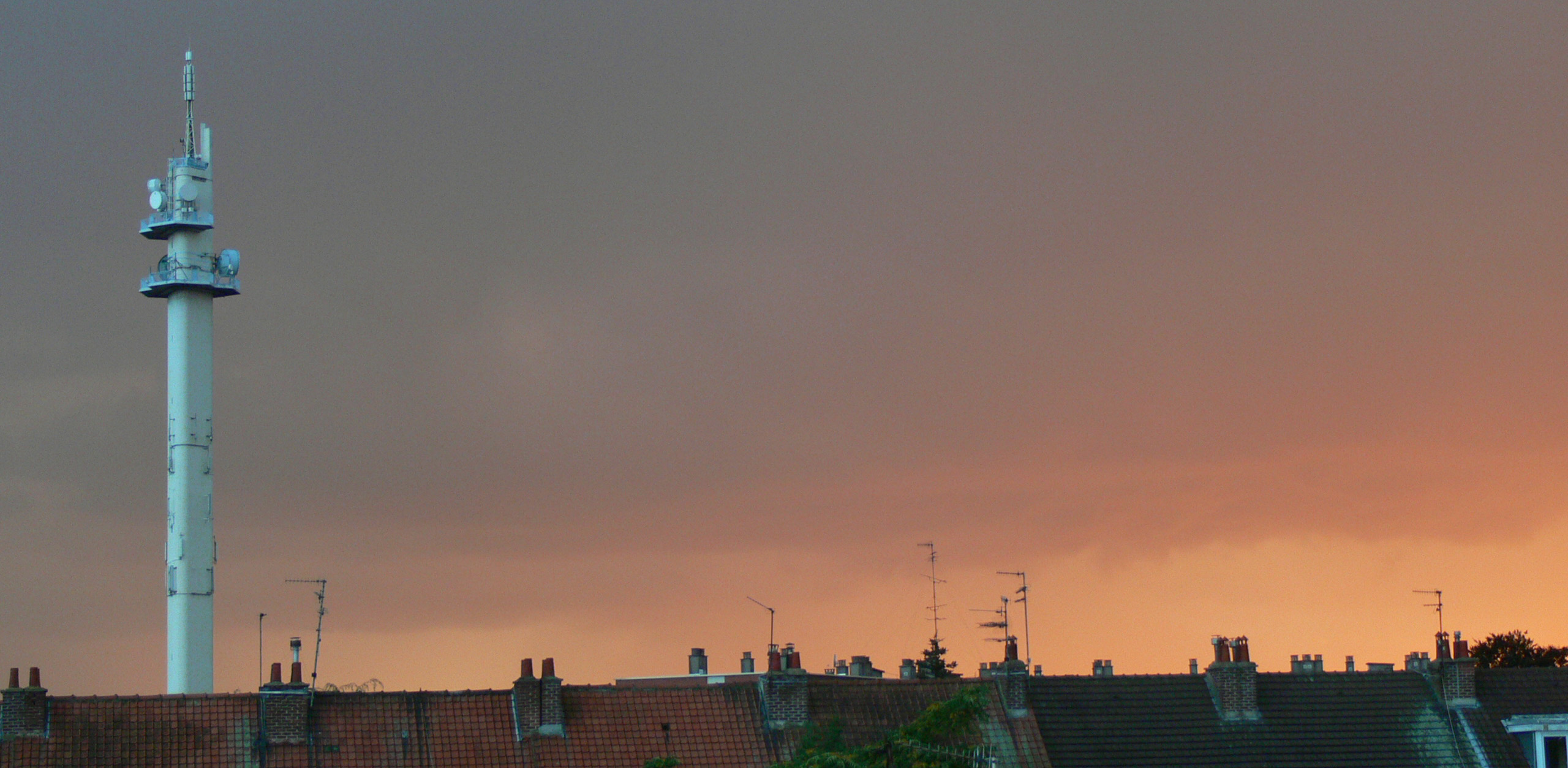
Transmission tower in Lambersart

There is a transmission tower in Lambersart, less powerful than that of Bondues, which allows the inhabitants of the urban Community of Lille and some peripheral zones to receive TNT (television numerique terrestre) since 31 March 2005. (At the end of 2006, 63% of the French population can receive the TNT, with more than 4 million having adapters. In northern France, only one quarter of the population receives it because of the obstruction of the radio relay system and of the international disagreements in this area). The architecture of the municipal police station is the pride of local lambersartois people.

== Transportation ==
Served by line 2 of the Lille Metro, it takes less than twenty minutes from metro station Lomme-Lambersart to Lille Flandres central station thanks to the many metro stations along the Avenue de Dunkerque, the city is also close to the St. Philibert metro station which is located between the hospital and shopping centre. Four bus lines serve Lambersart to central Lille.

The city is close to the A25 motorway, which provides quick access to Lesquin airport and other motorways in France such as the A1 to Paris.

== Notable people ==
- Jean Vercoutter - Egyptologist

== Twin towns ==
- Southborough, Kent (United Kingdom) since 1992
- Viersen (Germany) since 1964
- Kaniv (Ukraine)

== See also ==
- Communes of the Nord department
