= Arnould de Vuez =

French painter (1644–1720)

Arnould de Vuez (1644–1720) was a painter of Flemish origin active in Lille from 1680 to 1720.

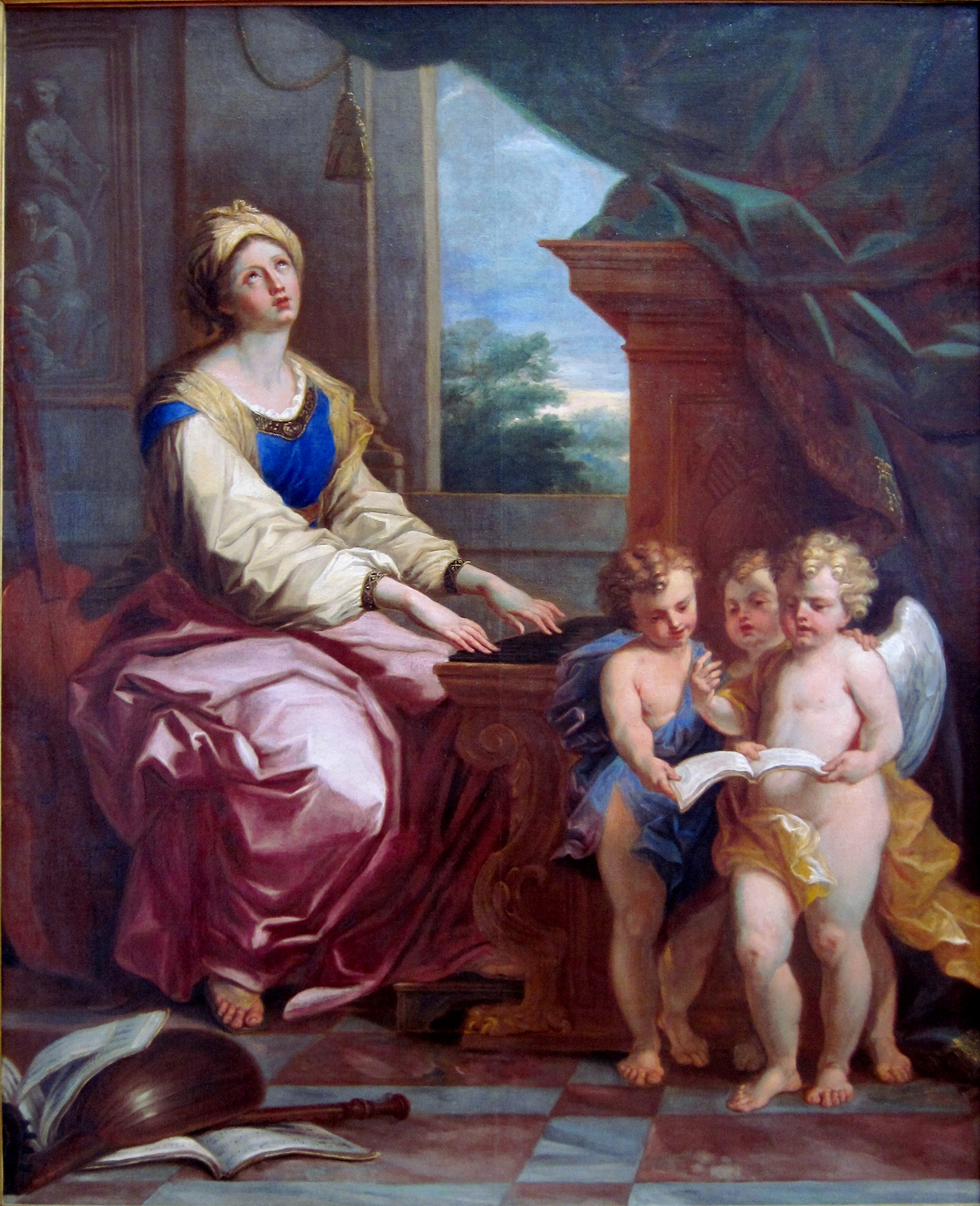
Arnould de Vuez, St Cecilia with angel musicians, c.1700

== Life ==
=== Family and training ===
Arnould de Vuez was born in 1644 in Saint-Omer . His father served as a soldier in order to feed his 8 children. Arnould left his birthplace for Paris to perfect his painting technique in the studio of Luc, a Récollet monk. He then moved to live with his uncle, a canon at Venice then Rome, where he won first prize for drawing at the Accademia di San Luca.

=== Career ===
Back in Paris, Arnould was under the protection of Charles Le Brun at the court of Louis XIV. A may at Notre Dame de Paris commissioned Arnould to paint "The Incredulity of St Thomas", held since the French Revolution at the primatiale st Jean de Lyon. On Lebrun's death Arnould established himself in Lille for fifty years, and the town was to offer him many opportunities. Since its conquest by Louis XIV the town was newly being redeveloped (Vauban built the citadel there) and Arnould de Vuez received commissions from religious institutions in the town and its surroundings, including the Hospice Comtesse and the Carmelites at Lille, the Carmelites at Douai, the Benedictines at Marchiennes and the Jesuits at Cambrai. His style was strongly influenced by the Italian Renaissance and the sense of colour in Flemish artists like Rubens and Anthony van Dyck.

In 2018, de Vuez's painting of the Marquis de Nointel arriving in Jerusalem was discovered in well-preserved condition, behind the wall of a Paris apartment at Rue de Marignan, 4 during its renovation into an Oscar de la Renta boutique. The artwork glued to the wall was hidden during occupation of Paris probably. It's reproduced as a rotogravure in the 1900 book by Albert Vandal Odyssey of an Ambassador: The Travels of the Marquis de Nointel, 1670-1680.

== Selected works ==
- Allegory of the alliance of the dauphin of France with Maria Anna of Bavaria, Louvre, oil on canvas, de Vuez's academy piece
- Saint Zita, oil on canvas (c 1696), Palais des Beaux-Arts de Lille
- Incredulity of St Thomas, oil on canvas, Primatiale Saint-Jean de Lyon (Lyon Cathedral)
- Saint Cecilia accompanied by three angel musicians, Palais des Beaux-Arts de Lille
- Adoration of the shepherds, oil on canvas, Église Saint-Étienne, Lille
- Mourning Virgin, oil on canvas, Palais des Beaux-Arts de Lille
- St Francis of Assisi receiving the stigmata, oil on canvas, Palais des Beaux-Arts de Lille
- Baldwin V of Hainaut and Marguerite d'Alsace, oil on canvas, Musée de l'Hospice Comtesse, Lille
- Charles the Bold, oil on canvas, Musée de l'Hospice Comtesse, Lille
- Charity, oil on canvas, Musée de l'Hospice Comtesse, Lille
- Faith, oil on canvas, Musée de l'Hospice Comtesse, Lille
- Martyrdom of Saint Ursula, oil on canvas, Musée de l'Hospice Comtesse, Lille
- Presentation of the Virgin, oil on canvas, tableau du maitre hotel, Musée de l'Hospice Comtesse, Lille
- Assumption of the Virgin, oil on canvas, Musée de l'Hospice Comtesse, Lille
- Mary of Burgundy, wife of Maximilian I of Austria, oil on canvas, Musée de l'Hospice Comtesse, Lille
- Marquis de Nointel entering the city of Jerusalem, 1674, oil on canvas, Oscar de la Renta boutique, Paris
