= Charles Marie François Olier, marquis de Nointel =

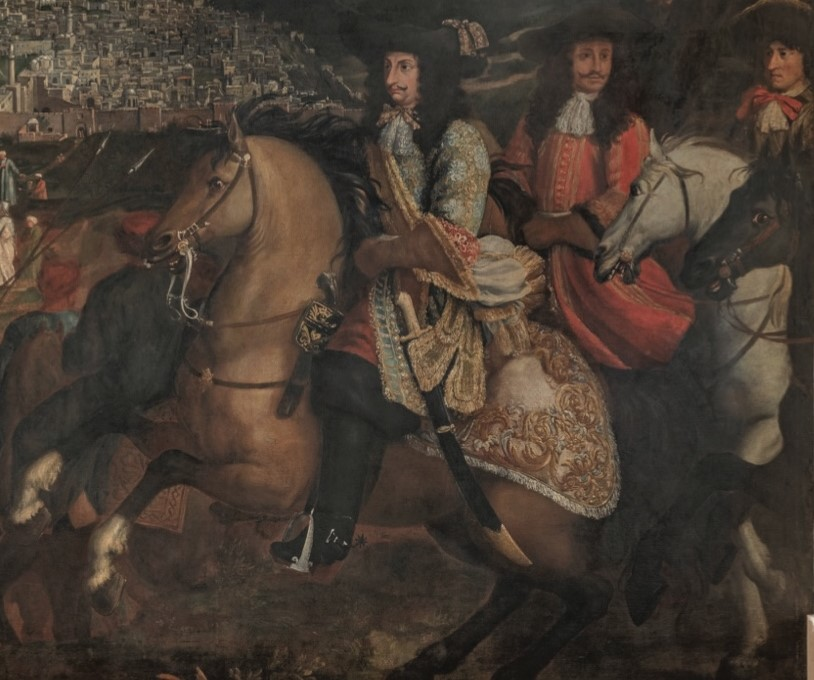
Nointel entering Jerusalem in 1674, by Arnould de Vuez

Charles-Marie-François Olier, marquis de Nointel (1635—1685), a councillor to the Parlement of Paris, was the French ambassador to the Ottoman court of Mehmed IV, from 1670 to 1679, charged from the first with renegotiating the Capitulations under which French merchants and others did business within the Ottoman Empire.

== Early life ==
Nointel, born and bred in Paris, came of a family of the noblesse de robe that was originally from Picardy. His father Édouard Olier, secretary to the King and councillor of the Parlement, had obtained a marquisate for his lands at Nointel near Clermont in the Beauvaisis. His wife was Catherine Mallon, a relative of the seigneurs of Bercy. Charles-François, the future ambassador was the eldest of four sons. At a young age he accompanied P.-E. de Coulanges on a memorable grand tour in 1658 through the courts of Germany and Turin and to Venice and Rome, assembling a cabinet of drawings and antiquities on his limited resources.

Returned to France, he was made a councillor to the Parlement of Paris. His charming manners and agreeable personality won the interest of Arnould de Pomponne, through whom he reached the circle of Jean-Baptiste Colbert and the Paris salons, where he developed the gallant, unattached reputation of an honnête homme, a sympathetic audience, a splendid host, a patron to the depletion of his limited fortune.

== Ambassador ==
His appointment as ambassador, after a successful campaign by his friends, combined political and commercial expectations. The embassy was to reopen strained relations with the Porte, which hung by a thread, without compromising in the least detail the grandeur of Louis XIV of France. For the Christians living under the Sultan's rule, and above all the Latin institutions, hospices, chapels, and the like, France wished to be declared official protector in an explicit article in renewed Capitulations. For the commerce of France he was urged to get the customs duties lowered from 5 to 3%, in line with those paid by the English and the Dutch, and to open the commerce of the Red Sea to France, for which enterprise he was accompanied by a director of the newly founded Compagnie du Levant, a prominent merchant of Marseille, Augustin Magy.

The embassy was fitted out with unusual grandeur and accompanied by four ships of the line with a detachment of marines and a troop of twenty-seven noble gentlemen, well representing France. The interests of Port-Royal required that Nointel try to collect some signed declarations of faith from Eastern Catholics over the point of transubstantiation, contested with the Protestants; to aid him in these pursuits, somewhat beyond his usual competence, he had the assistance of the young orientalist Antoine Galland, the future translator of The Thousand and One Nights, as translator and theological attaché. Galland's anecdotal and picturesque journal of the embassy formed a counterpart to Nointel's official correspondence and dispatches. He shared Nointel's passion for Classical Antiquity. The painter Jacques Carrey was also part of the entourage.

The embassy fleet left from Toulon, 21 August 1670.

By June 1673 he had achieved a reduction in customs charges, putting France on an equal footing with England and Holland and giving new life to French commerce in the Levant. The project of placing Christians and Christian institutions under French patronage was less successful, resulting in numerous actions at law. In the 1670s, the village of Ein Karem with the Church of Saint John the Baptist were given to the Franciscans through the influence of the Marquis de Nointel.

In September 1673 he made a tour to enregister these new prerogatives; it took him to Chios, the Cyclades, Palestine and Egypt ending at Athenes; it lasted seventeen months.

From his tour in the East he made precious acquisitions of coins and medals, marbles and other Antiquities, occurring such debts in the process that Louis XIV, unwilling to pay them, recalled him in 1680.

== In culture ==
In 2018 in Paris during renovation works in the building rented by Alex Bolen for Oscar de la Renta boutique (4, Rue de Marignan) were discovered hand-painted ceiling and then a painting of Marquis de Nointel entering the city of Jerusalem created by Arnould de Vuez in 1674. It was reproduced as a rotogravure in the 1900 book by Albert Vandal Odyssey of an Ambassador: The Travels of the Marquis de Nointel, 1670-1680. The artwork glued to the wall was hidden during Occupation of Paris probably. Due to an agreement with the building's owners the painting will remain at its place while the store was a tenant (the initial lease is for 10 years) while the company will restore it.

== See also ==
- Suleiman Aga

== Bibliography ==
- Conder, C.R.; Kitchener, H.H. (1883). The Survey of Western Palestine: Memoirs of the Topography, Orography, Hydrography, and Archaeology. Vol. 3. London: Committee of the Palestine Exploration Fund.
- Vandal, A. (1900). L'Odyssée d'un Ambassadeur: Les voyages du marquis de Nointel (1670-1680). Paris: Plon-Nourrit.
- Pringle, D. (1993). The Churches of the Crusader Kingdom of Jerusalem: A-K (excluding Acre and Jerusalem). Vol. I. Cambridge University Press. ISBN 0-521-39036-2.

Diplomatic posts
Preceded by Denis de La Haye	French Ambassador to the Ottoman Empire; 1670–1679	Succeeded by Gabriel de Guilleragues
