= Palais des Beaux-Arts de Lille =

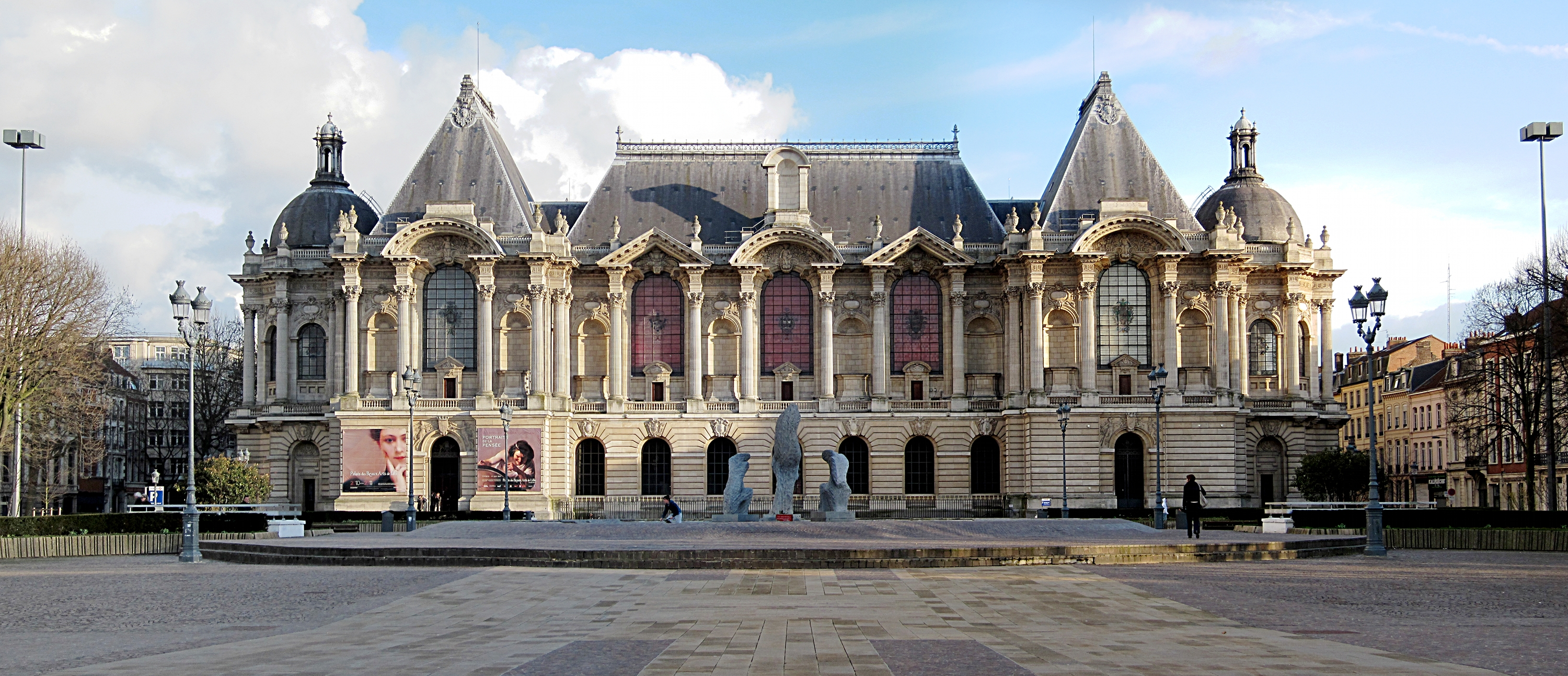
- Palais des Beaux-Arts de Lille
- Established: 1809
- Location: Place de la République, 59000 Lille, France
- Coordinates: 50.630353°N 3.062906°E
- Type: Art gallery
- Visitors: 239,975 (2007)
- Director: Bruno Girveau
- Website: pba-lille.fr

The Palais des Beaux-Arts de Lille (Lille Palace of Fine Arts) is a municipal museum dedicated to fine arts, modern art, and antiquities located in Lille. It is one of the largest art museums in France.

It was established in the early 19th century through the initiative of Napoleon I. Jean-Antoine Chaptal's decree of 1801 named fifteen French cities (among them Lille) to house the artworks from churches and occupied European territories seized by the armies of Revolutionary France. Louis Joseph Watteau and his son François-Louis-Joseph Watteau, known as the "Watteau of Lille", played a leading role in the founding of the museum. In 1795, Louis Watteau drew up the first inventory of the paintings and François served as deputy curator from 1808 to 1823.

The museum opened in 1809 and was initially housed in a church confiscated from the Récollets before being transferred to the city's town hall. In 1866, the "musée Wicar", formed from the collection of Jean-Baptiste Wicar, was merged into the Palais des Beaux-Arts. Construction of the Palais's current Baroque-revival-style building began in 1885 under the direction of Géry Legrand, mayor of Lille, and it was completed in 1892. The architects chosen to design the new building were Edouard Bérard (1843–1912) and Fernand Etienne-Charles Delmas (1852–1933) from Paris. During the early 20th century, Victor Mollet served as its official architect. The building is located on the place de la République, in the center of the city, facing the préfecture of Lille. It was renovated during the 1990s and reopened in 1997.

At the start of the 1990s, the building's poor state and the moving of Vauban's relief models of fortified towns to Lille forced the town to renovate the building. Work began in 1991, under the architects Jean-Marc Ibos and Myrto Vitart, and was completed in 1997. This allowed the creation of a new 700 m^{2} basement room for temporary exhibitions, as well as departments for the relief models and for 19th-century sculpture. Overall the museum covers 22000 m^{2} and held 72430 pieces as of 2015, one of the largest provincial collections of fine art. The collection includes works by Raphael, Donatello, Van Dyck, Tissot, Jordaens, Goya, El Greco, David, Corot, Courbet, Toulouse-Lautrec, Delacroix, Rubens, Rodin, Claudel and Jean Siméon Chardin.

== Collections ==
=== Antiquities, Middle Ages and Renaissance ===
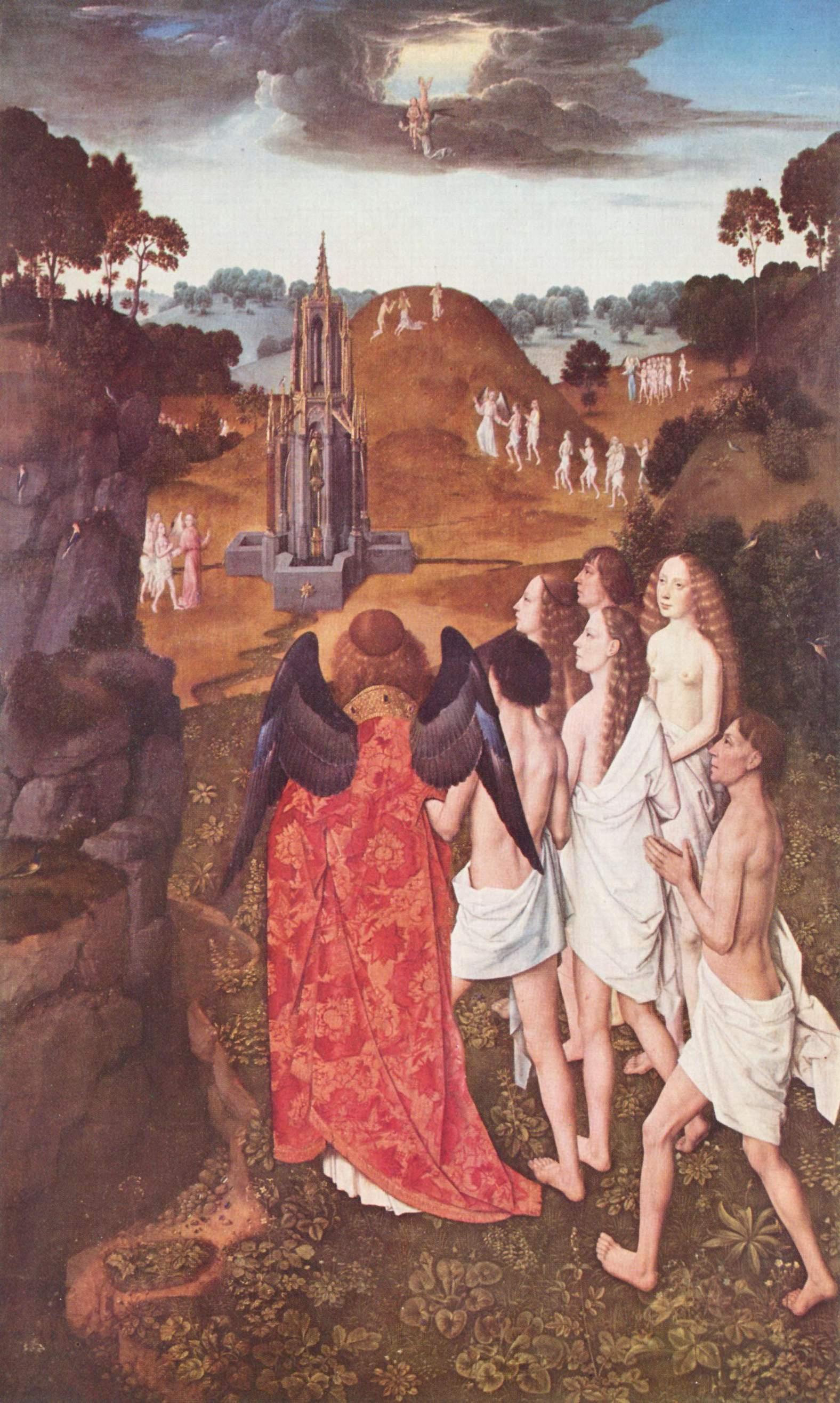
Ascension of the Elect by Dieric Bouts.

- Ascension of the Elect, Dieric Bouts, oil on wood (c 1450)
- Fall of the Damned, Dieric Bouts, oil on wood (c 1450)
- Portrait of man, skull in a niche, Barthel Bruyn, oil on wood
- Three donors with Saint John the Baptist, Barthel Bruyn the Younger, oil on wood
- The Virgin and the Sleeping Jesus, Joos van Cleve, oil on wood (16th century)
- The Virgin nursing the Infant Jesus, Joos van Cleve, oil on wood (16th century)
- Christ blessing the Virgin, Jacob Cornelisz van Amsterdam, oil on wood (16th century)
- The Virgin, the Infant Jesus and saint Cecilia, Domenico Panetti
- Trinity, triptych of Marchiennes, Jean Bellegambe, oil on wood (c 1510)
- Triptych of the mystic bath, Jehan Bellegambe, oil on wood (1510)
- Feast of Herod, Donatello, marble (vers 1435)
- Vanity, Jan Sanders van Hemessen, oil on wood (c 1535–1540)
- Virgin and Child surrounded by angels, Master of the Embroidered Foliage, triptych, oil on wood (c 1495–1500)
- Portraits of Louis de Quarre and Barbe de Cruysinck as donors; saint Barbara and saint Louis on foot under arcades, Master of the Embroidered Foliage, oil on wood (c 1495–1500)
- The Virgin in glory amidst the apostles, Master of the Lyversberg Passion, oil on wood (c 1460–1480)
- Adoration of the Shepherds, Master of the Lille Adoration, oil on wood (1520)
- Preaching of saint John the Baptist, Master of the Lille Preaching, oil on wood (1530–1540)
- Vierge au lait, Maître des Madones mosanes, marble (c 1350)
- Adoration of the Magi, Maître MS, oil on wood (c 1506–1510)
- Saint Dorothea and Saint Mary Magdalen, Master of saint-Séverin, two panels, oil on wood (1480–1520)
- Noli me tangere, Lambert Sustris (1548-1560)
- The Resurrection and La Vierge du rosaire, anonymous, South German, oil on wood (c 1480–1490)
- Adoration of the Magi, anonymous, triptych, oil on wood (c 1510–1520)
- Saint Henri and saint Cunégonde, saint Jerome and a bishop saint, predella of the retable of saint George, anonymous, Tyrol, oil on wood (c 1520)
- Saint John the Baptist and saint Catherine, anonymous, German, oil on wood (16th century)
- Saint Barbara and two saints, anonymous, German, oil on wood (16th century)
- Sketch for Paradise, Veronese, oil on wood

=== 17th-century paintings ===
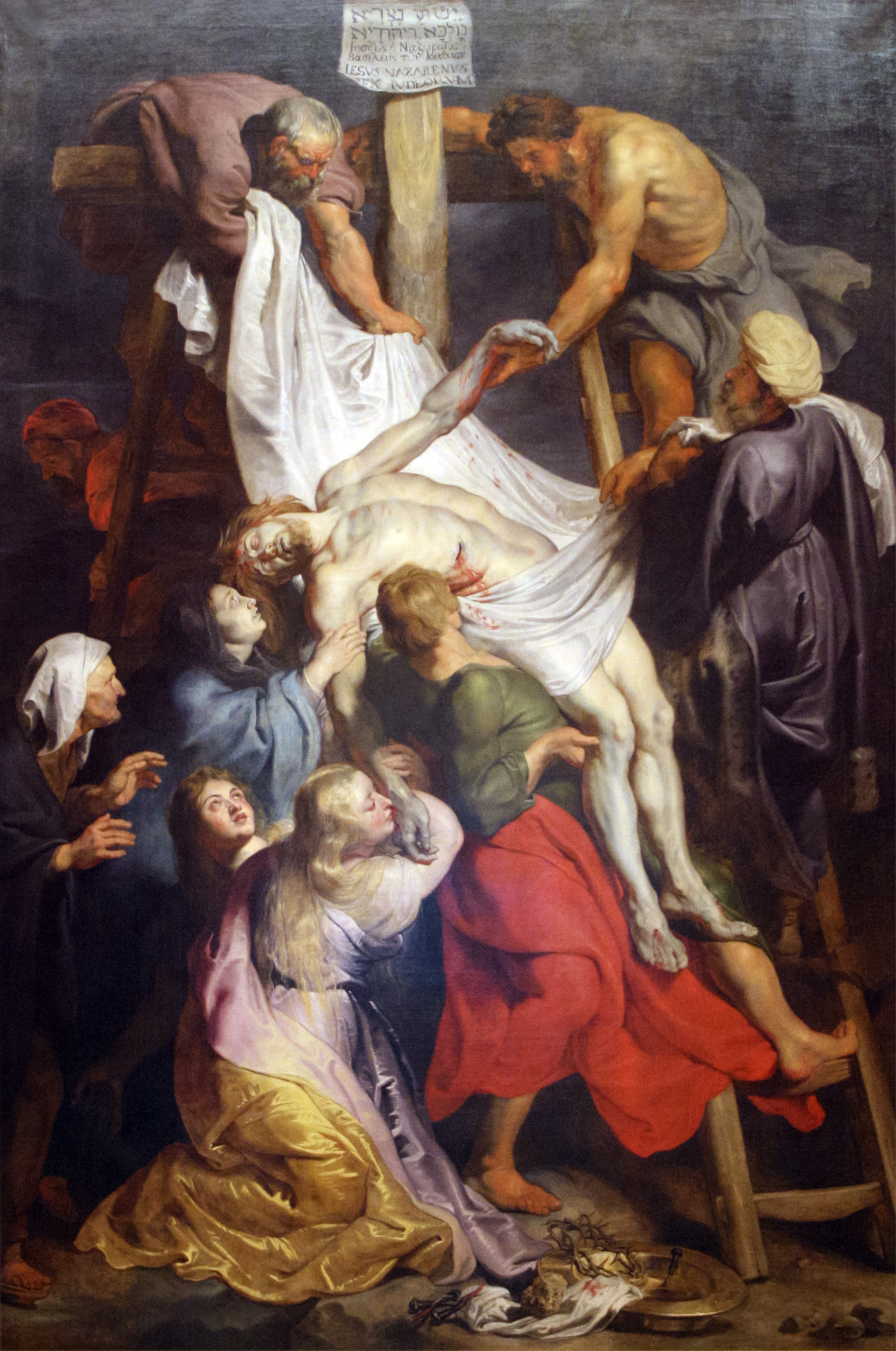
Descent from the Cross by Rubens

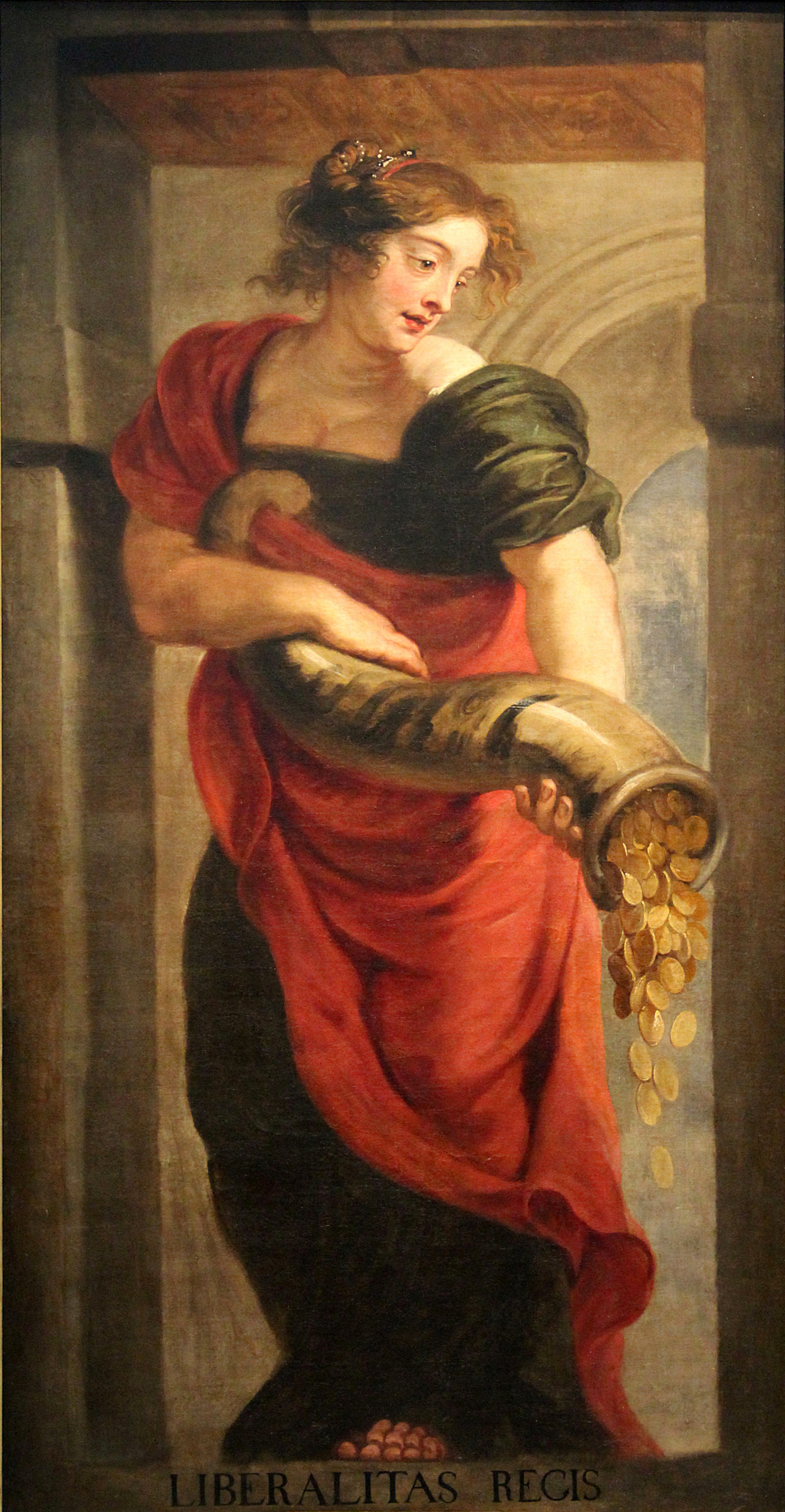
The Liberality of the King by Jan van den Hoecke - Workshop of Peter Paul Rubens.

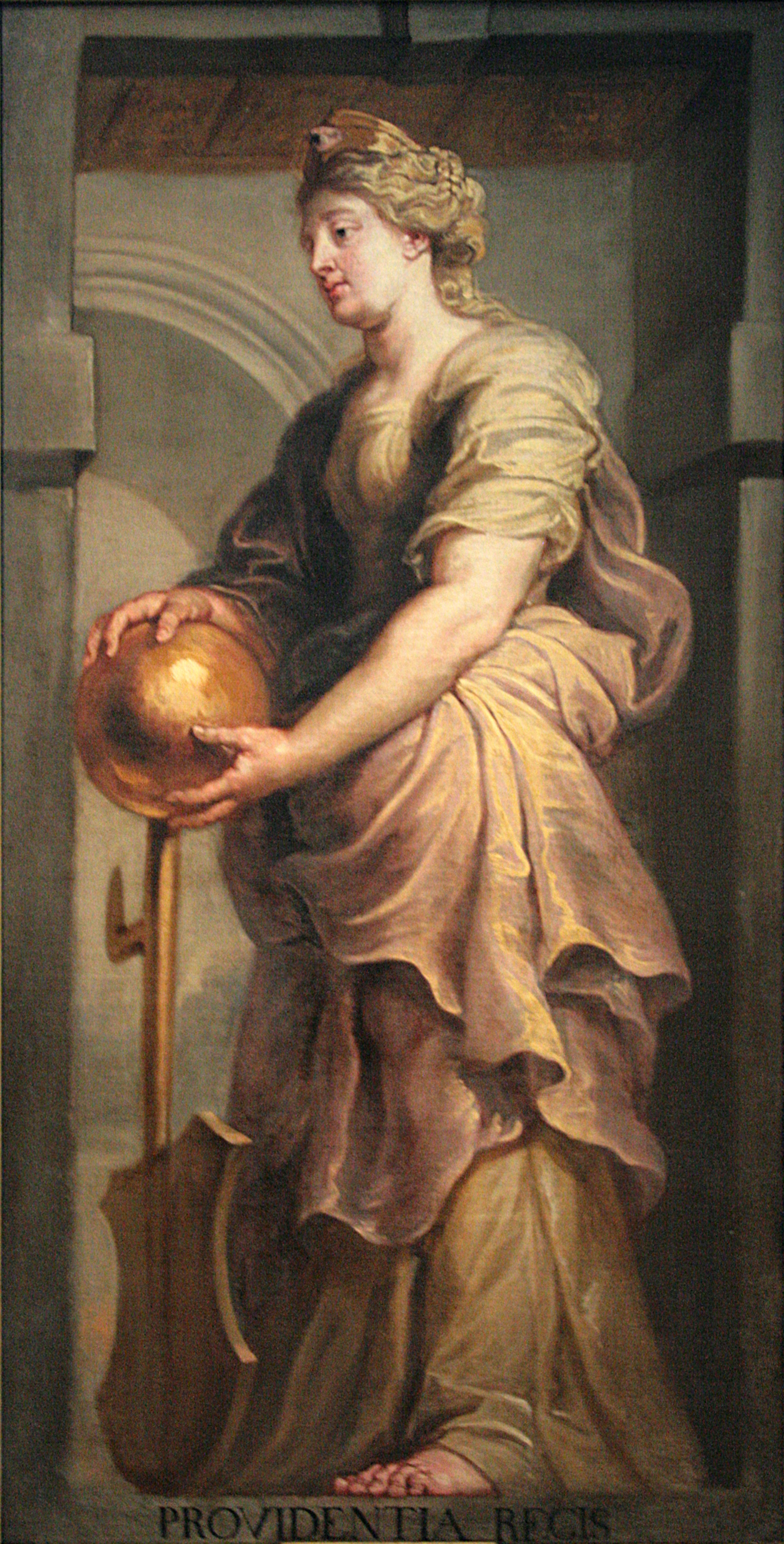
The Providence of the King by Jan van den Hoecke - Workshop of Peter Paul Rubens.

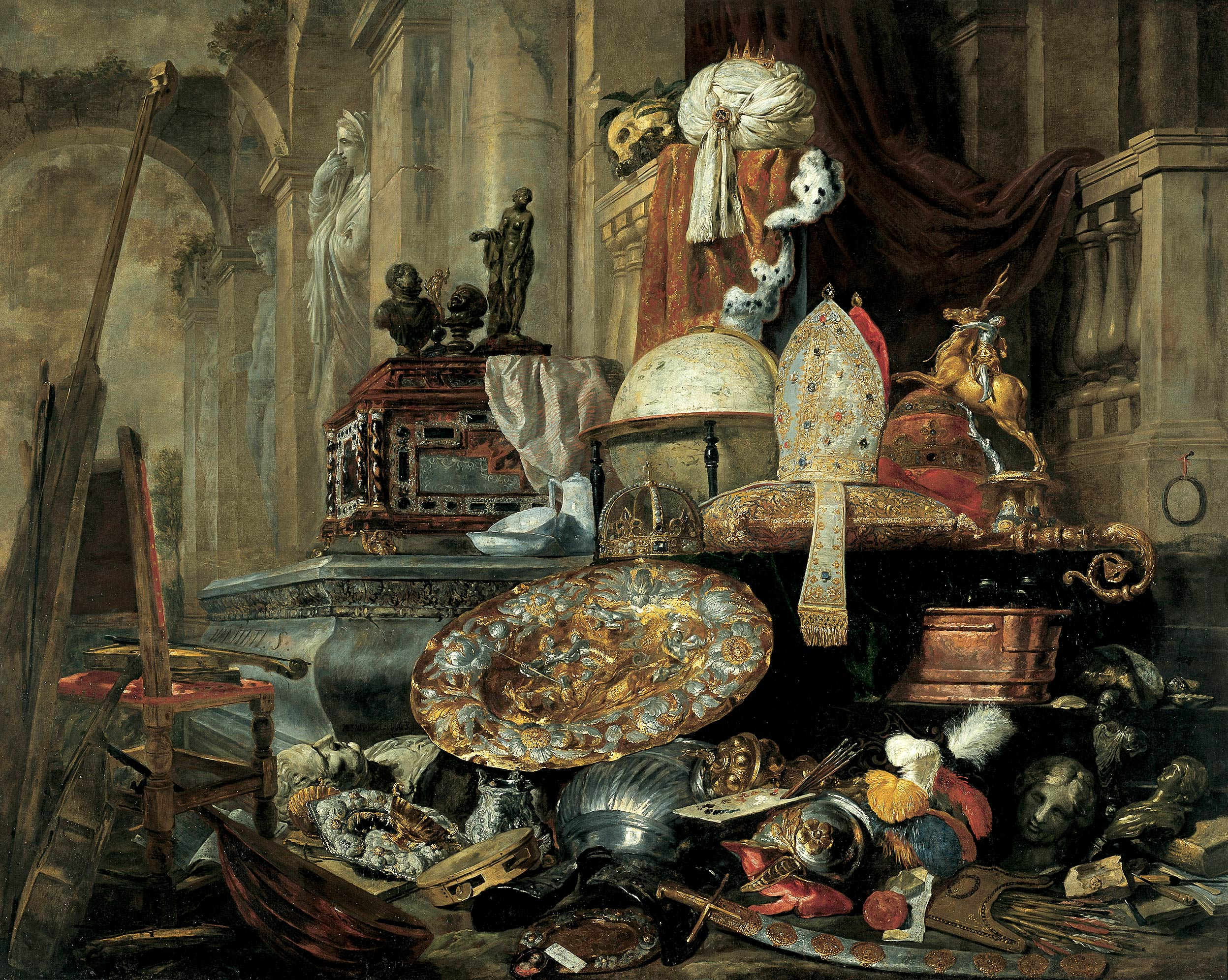
Allegory of the Vanities of the World by Pieter Boel

- Rest of the Holy Family, Pieter van Avont, oil on wood
- Martyrdom of saint Maurice and his companions, Jan Boeckorst known as Lange Jan, oil on canvas (1661)
- Allegory of the Vanities of the World, Pieter Boel, oil on canvas (1663)
- Coronation the Virgin, Thomas Willeboirts Bosschaert, oil on canvas
- Ecstasy of saint Rosalie of Palermo, Theodor Boeyermans, oil on canvas
- The Nativity, Philippe de Champaigne, oil on canvas
- Antique landscape, Philippe de Champaigne, oil on canvas
- Saint Nicolas saving the prisoners, Jan Cossiers, oil on canvas (1660)
- The Miraculous Fish or The apostles reporting to Christ the fruit of their enterprise, Gaspard de Crayer, oil on wood
- Martyrdom of the crowned martyrs : Claudius, Nicolastratus, Symphorianus, Castor and Simplicius, Gaspard de Crayer, oil on wood
- Miracle of Saint Anthony of Padua at Toulouse, Anthony van Dyck, oil on wood (c 1627–1630)
- Christ on the cross, Anthony van Dyck, oil on canvas
- Portrait of Marie de Médicis, reine de France, Anthony van Dyck
- Christ climbing to Calvary and being recognised by saint Veronica, Frans II Francken, oil on wood (c 1615–1620)
- Presentation of the Holy Tunic to Charles V, Frans II Francken, oil on wood (c 1615)
- Ball on a palace terrace or ball at the court of Don John of Austria, Hieronymus Janssens known as Le danseur, oil on canvas (1658)
- Christ and the Pharisees, Jacob Jordaens, oil on canvas (c 1660)
- The Abduction of Europa, Jacob Jordaens, oil on canvas (1643)
- Portrait of a man, Jacob Jordaens, oil on wood
- Susanna and the Elders, Jacob Jordaens, oil on canvas
- The distress of the prodigal son, Jacob Jordaens
- A piqueur and his dogs, Jacob Jordaens, (1635)
- Saint Mary Magdalene at prayer, Eustache Le Sueur, oil on canvas
- Burial, Pieter Lastman, oil on wood (1612)
- Moses dividing the waters, Johann Liss, oil on canvas
- St Peter causing a cloud to protect the faithful from the sun, Jeremias Mittendorf], oil on wood (1629)
- Martyrdom of Saint Peter of Verona, Jeremias Mittendorff, oil on canvas (1629)
- Saint Peter unmasking a false Madonna that had appeared in a heretics' temple, Jeremias Mittendorff, oil on wood (1629)
- Soldiers casting lots for the tunic of Christ, Nicolas Régnier
- St Jerome, José de Ribera, oil on canvas (1643)
- Descent from the Cross, Rubens, oil on canvas (circa 1617)
- Martyrdom of St Catherine, Rubens, oil on canvas (circa 1615)
- Ecstasy of Mary Magdalen, Rubens, oil on canvas (circa 1619)
- Royal Generosity, Jan van den Hoecke, oil on canvas (1635) - Workshop of Rubens
- Royal Providence, Jan van den Hoecke, oil on canvas (1635) - Workshop of Rubens
- Saint François receiving the Christ Child from the Virgin's hands, Rubens, oil on canvas (c 1617)
- Birth of the Virgin, Jacques Stella
- Renaud and Armide, Alessandro Tiarini, oil on canvas
- Apotheosis of St Francis of Paul, Theodoor van Thulden, oil on wood
- Martyrdom of St Philippe, oil on wood (c 1645–1648)
- Jesus's arrest in the Garden of Olives, Simon de Vos, oil on copper (vers 1650–1670)
- Jesus tried before Caiaphas, Simon de Vos, oil on copper (c 1650–1670)
- Saint Zita, Arnould de Vuez, oil on canvas (c 1696)
- Saint Cecilia accompanied by three angel musicians, Arnould de Vuez
- Mourning Virgin, Arnould de Vuez, oil on canvas
- St Anthony of Assisi receiving the stigmata, Arnould de Vuez, oil on canvas
- Interior of the Nieuwe Kerk at Delft, Emanuel de Witte
- The Denarius of Caesar, Gerbrand van den Eeckhout (1673)

=== 18th- and 19th-century paintings ===
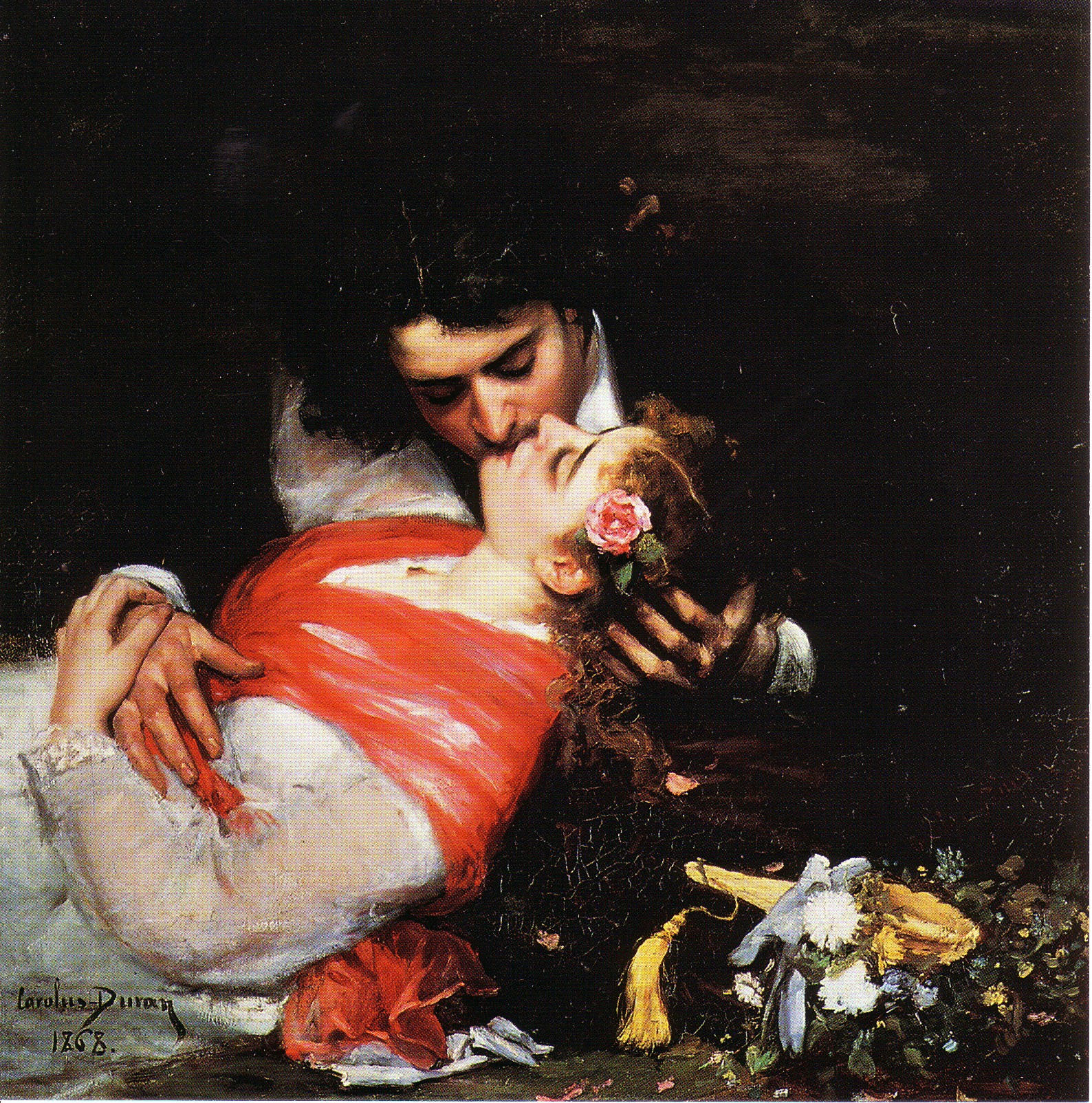
The Kiss by Carolus-Duran

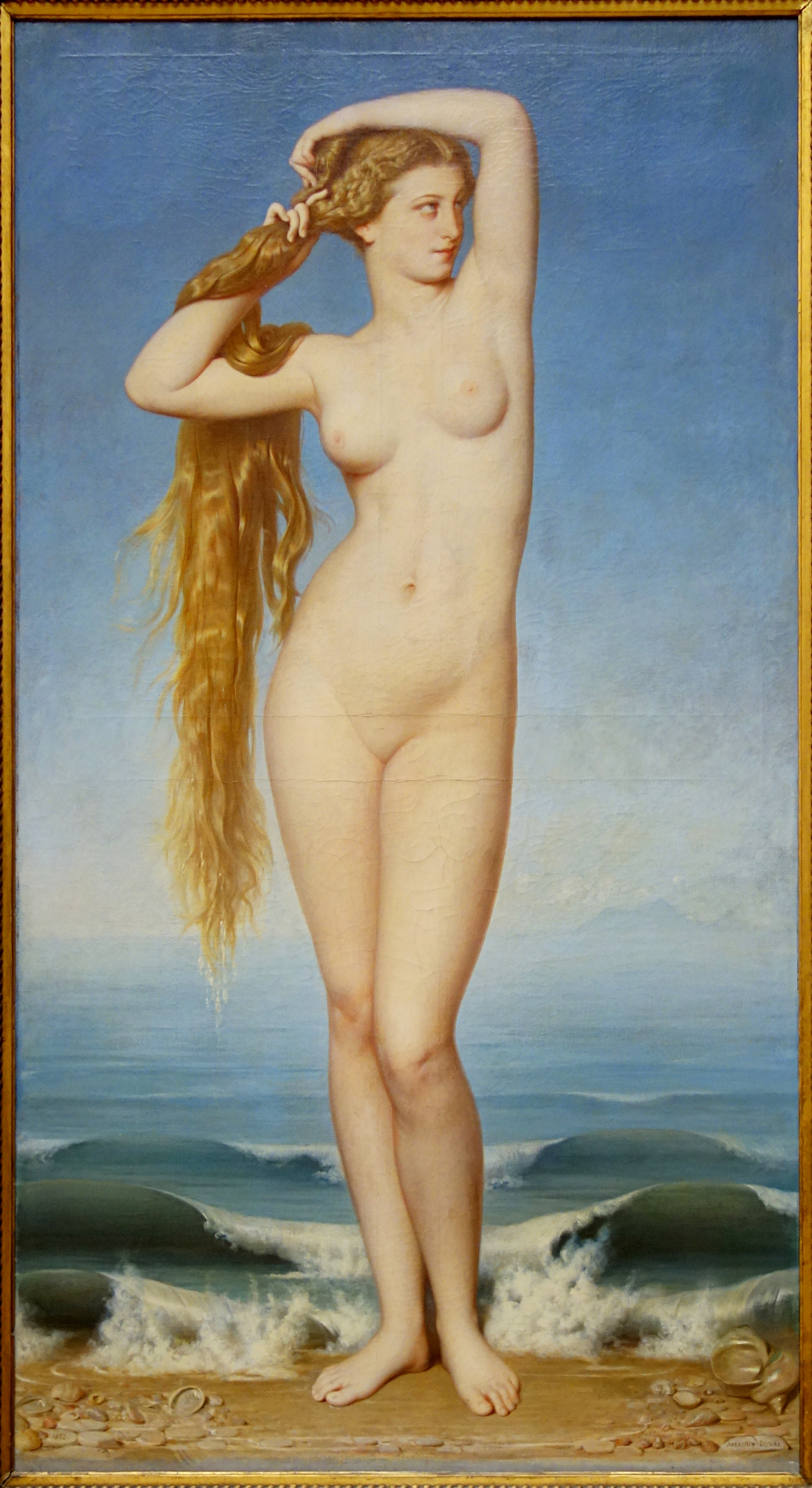
The Birth of Venus by Amaury Duval

- Vanity, Alfred Agache, oil on canvas (1885)
- Portrait of Madame d’Aucourt de Saint-Just, Louis-Léopold Boilly, oil on canvas (c. 1800)
- Portrait of Monsieur d’Aucourt de Saint-Just, Boilly, oil on canvas (c. 1800)
- Portrait, said to be of Robespierre, Boilly, oil on canvas
- Portrait of the sculptor Jean-Antoine Houdon, Boilly, oil study on paper
- Portrait of Julien Boilly enfant, Boilly, oil on canvas
- My foot of beef, Boilly, oil on canvas
- Triumph of Marat, Boilly, paper on canvas
- 23 studies for "the Studio of Isabey", Boilly, paper on canvas
- Tobias fighting his father, Bon Boullongne, oil on canvas (c. 1705)
- Lady in black, Carolus-Duran, oil on cartoon (1859)
- Sleeping man, Carolus-Duran, oil on canvas (1861)
- The Kiss, Carolus-Duran, oil on canvas (1868)
- Lady with a dog, Carolus-Duran, (1870)
- The silver goblet, Jean-Baptiste-Siméon Chardin, oil on canvas (c. 1730)
- Elevation of the Cross, Alphonse Colas, (1849)
- Idyll or Cache-Cache, Jean-Baptiste Corot
- View of Honfleur, Gustave Courbet
- An Après-dîner at Ornans, Gustave Courbet, oil on canvas (1848–1849)
- Belisarius begging alms, Jacques-Louis David, oil on canvas (1781)
- Apelles painting Campaspe in Alexander's presence, Jacques-Louis David, oil on wood (1814)
- Medea, Eugène Delacroix, oil on canvas (1838)
- Hêtraie in the forest of Fontainebleau, Constant Dutilleux
- The Birth of Venus, Amaury Duval, oil on canvas (1862)
- Persuasion, Cyprian Godebski
- The Young People or The Letter, Francisco de Goya
- The Old People or Time, Francisco de Goya, oil on canvas (c. 1808–1812)
- Psyche crowning Love, Jean-Baptiste Greuze, oil on canvas
- Portrait of Berthe Morisot with a Fan, Édouard Manet
- Portrait of the artist, Odilon Redon, oil on canvas (c. 1880)
- The Supper at Emmaus, Jean Restout, oil on canvas (1735)
- Landscape at Grandcamp, Georges Seurat, oil on wood (1885)

=== 20th-century paintings ===
- Olga au col de fourrure, Pablo Picasso
- Rythme Coloré, Sonia Delaunay
- The barn, Constant Permeke
- Portrait of a woman, Rik Wouters
- Poelle flamand, Édouard Pignon
- Portrait, Ladislas Kijno
- Butterfly on a wheel, Fernand Léger
- Ecluse, Vieira da Silva
- Composition on the word cheval, Auguste Herbin
- Triptych, Marcel Lempereur-Haut
- Composition, Serge Poliakoff

=== Sculptures ===
- Penelope, Émile-Antoine Bourdelle, bronze statue (1909)
- Charles Frédéric Kuhlmann, Albert-Ernest Carrier-Belleuse, marble bust (c 1868–1870)
- The Pisan, Carolus-Duran, bronze
- Louise Claudel, Camille Claudel, terracotta bust
- Giganti or Head of a brigand, Camille Claudel, bronze head
- The Kisser, Gustave Crauk, plaster
- Cincinnatus, Denis Foyatier, plaster statue
- Knight errant, Emmanuel Frémiet, plaster equestrian statue (1878)
- Narcissus, Ernest-Eugène Hiolle, plaster statue (c 1867–1868)
- The Fever of Caumartin, Jean-Antoine Houdon, bronze-painted plaster bust (1779)
- Camulogene, Eugène-Louis Lequesne, plaster statue (1872)
- Satyr and bacchante, James Pradier, painted plaster (c 1833)
- Apollo and the muses, Emile Morlaix, original plaster
- Dying Hero, René Leleu, bronze
- La Séve, Gaston Watkin, stone
- Athlete, Gerard Choain, bronze
- Joan of Arc and other pieces, Alphonse-Amédée Cordonnier

=== Prints and drawings ===
- Preparatory drawing for the "Alba Madonna". Seated man wearing a shirt, bare arms., Raphael (c. 1511)

=== Collection of "plans-reliefs" ===
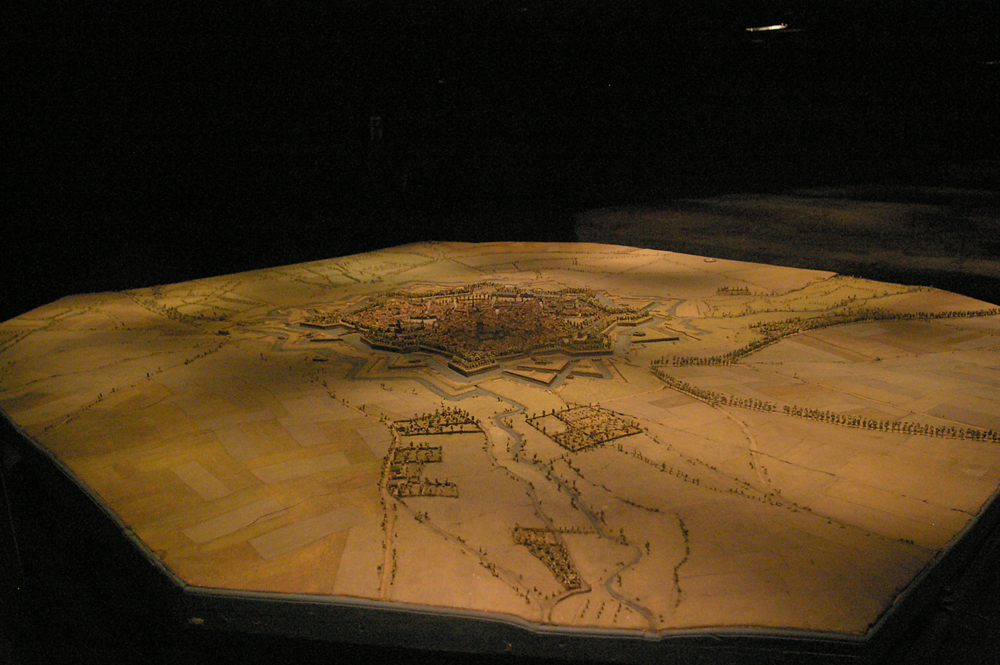
Plan-relief of Ath

- Calais France, 753 × 463 cm, 1/600 scale, 6 tables (1691)
- Charleroi Belgium, 405 × 340 cm, 1/600 scale, 4 tables (1695)
- Ath Belgium, 480 × 378 cm, 1/600 scale, 5 tables (1697)
- Ypres Belgium, by engineer Tessier de Derville, 944 × 548 cm, 1/600 scale, 12 tables (1698–1702)
- Bergues France, 441 × 376 cm, 1/600 scale, 6 tables (1699)
- Tournai Belgium, by engineer Montaigu, 654 × 580 cm, 1/600 scale, 11 tables (1701)
- Menin Belgium, 542 × 372 cm, 1/600 scale, 6 tables (1702)
- Bouchain France, by engineer Ladevèze, 418 × 295 cm, 1/600 scale, 5 tables (1715)
- Lille France, by engineer Nicolas de Nézot, 440 × 400 cm, 1/600 scale, 7 tables, paper, silk and wood (1740–1743)
- Aire-sur-la-Lys France, by engineer Nicolas de Nézot, 590 × 467 cm, 1/600 scale, 15 tables, paper, silk and wood (1743)
- Audenarde Belgium, by engineer Nicolas de Nézot, 548 × 416 cm, 1/600 scale, 11 tables, paper, silk and wood (1747)
- Namur Belgium, by engineer Larcher d'Aubencourt, 776 × 650 cm, 1/600 scale, 22 tables (1747–1750)
- Maastricht Netherlands, by engineer Larcher d'Aubencourt, 689 × 580 cm, 1/600 scale, 13 tables (1752)
- Gravelines France, by engineer Lusca, 460 × 373 cm, 1/600 scale, 7 tables, paper, silk and wood (1756)
- Avesnes France, 753 × 525 cm, 1/600 scale, 18 tables (1824–1826)

== Gallery ==
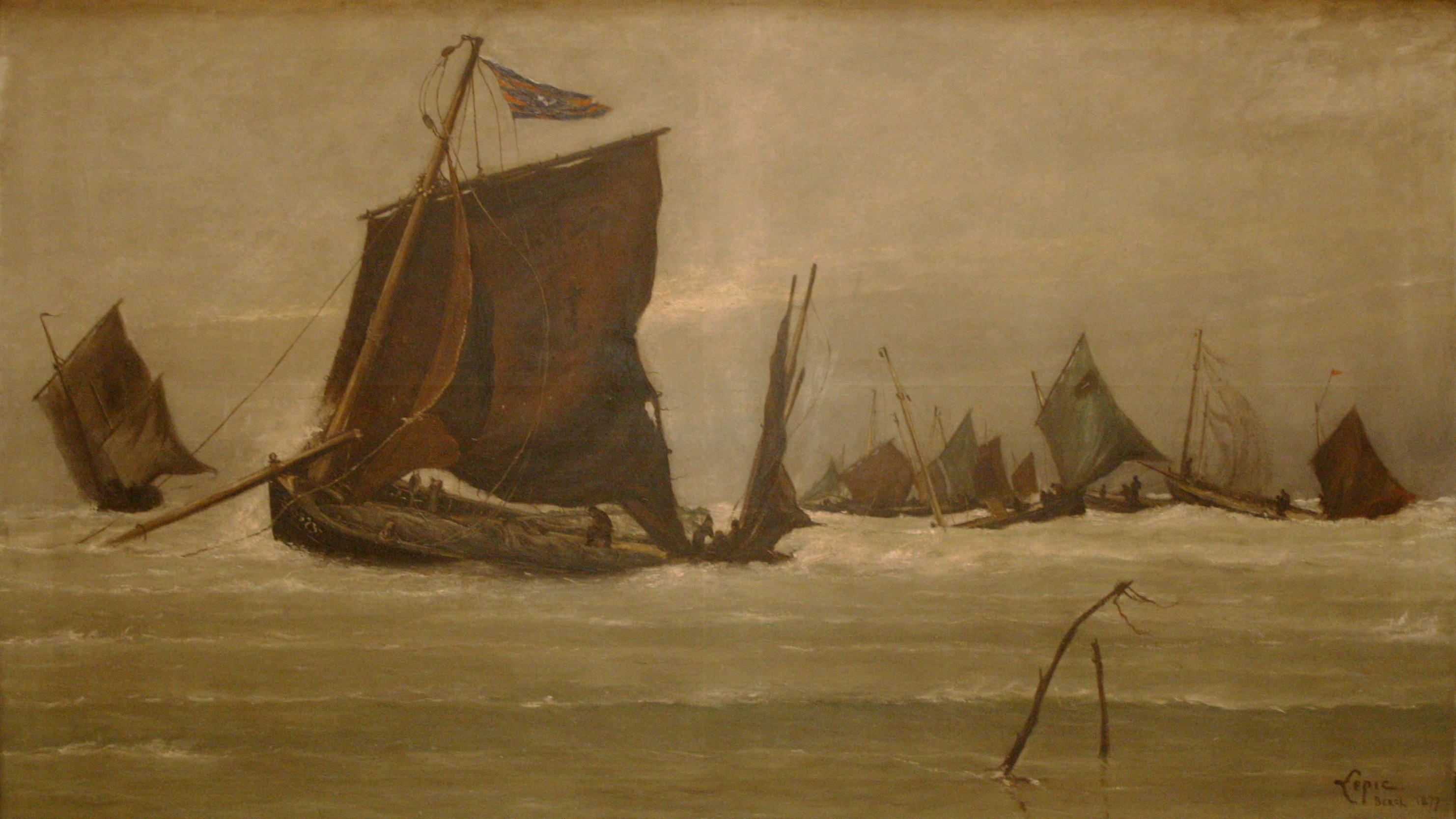
Bateaux de pêche rentrant à Berck by Ludovic Napoléon, comte Lepic

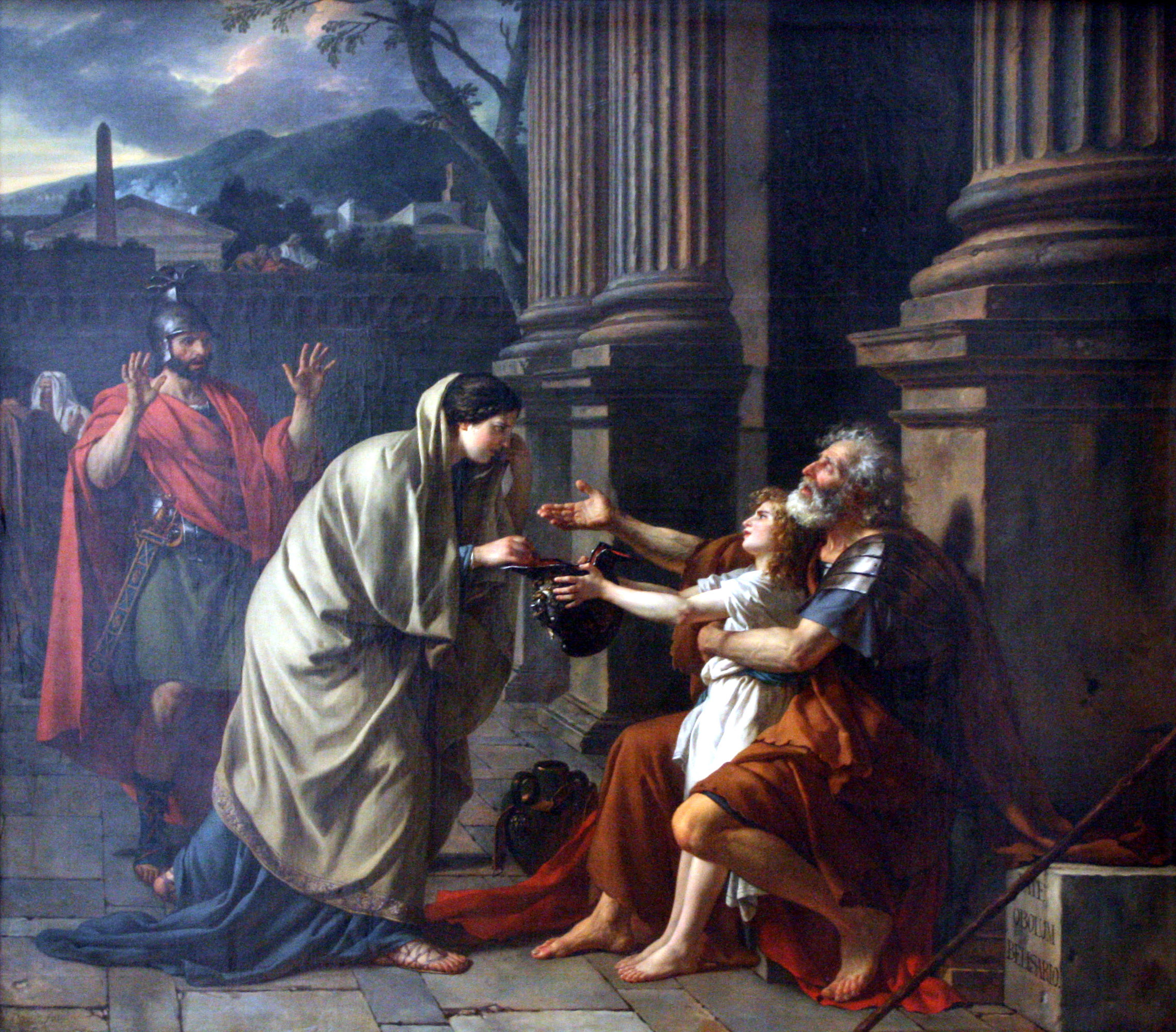
Belisarius by Jacques-Louis David

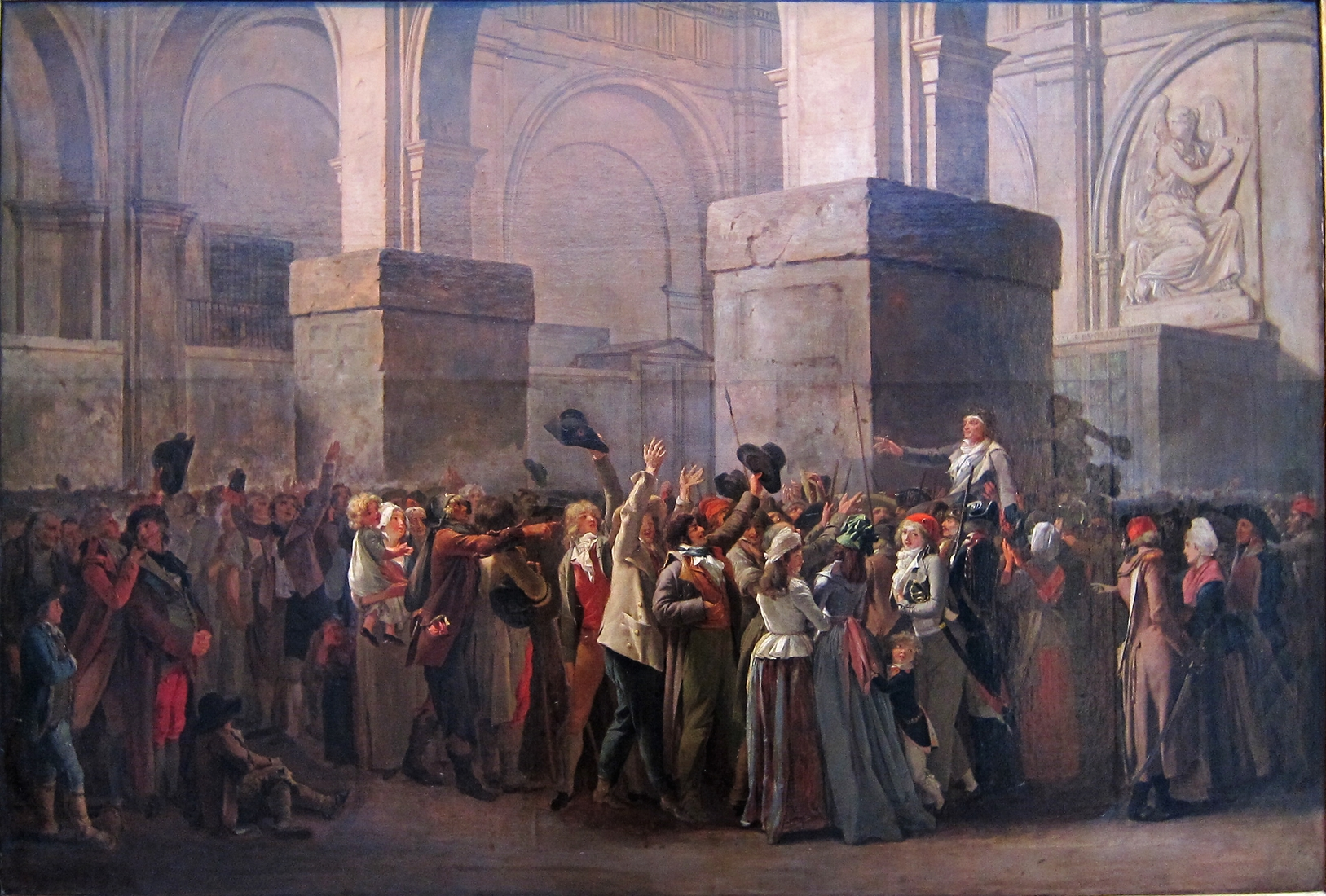
The Triumph of Marat by Louis-Léopold Boilly, 1794

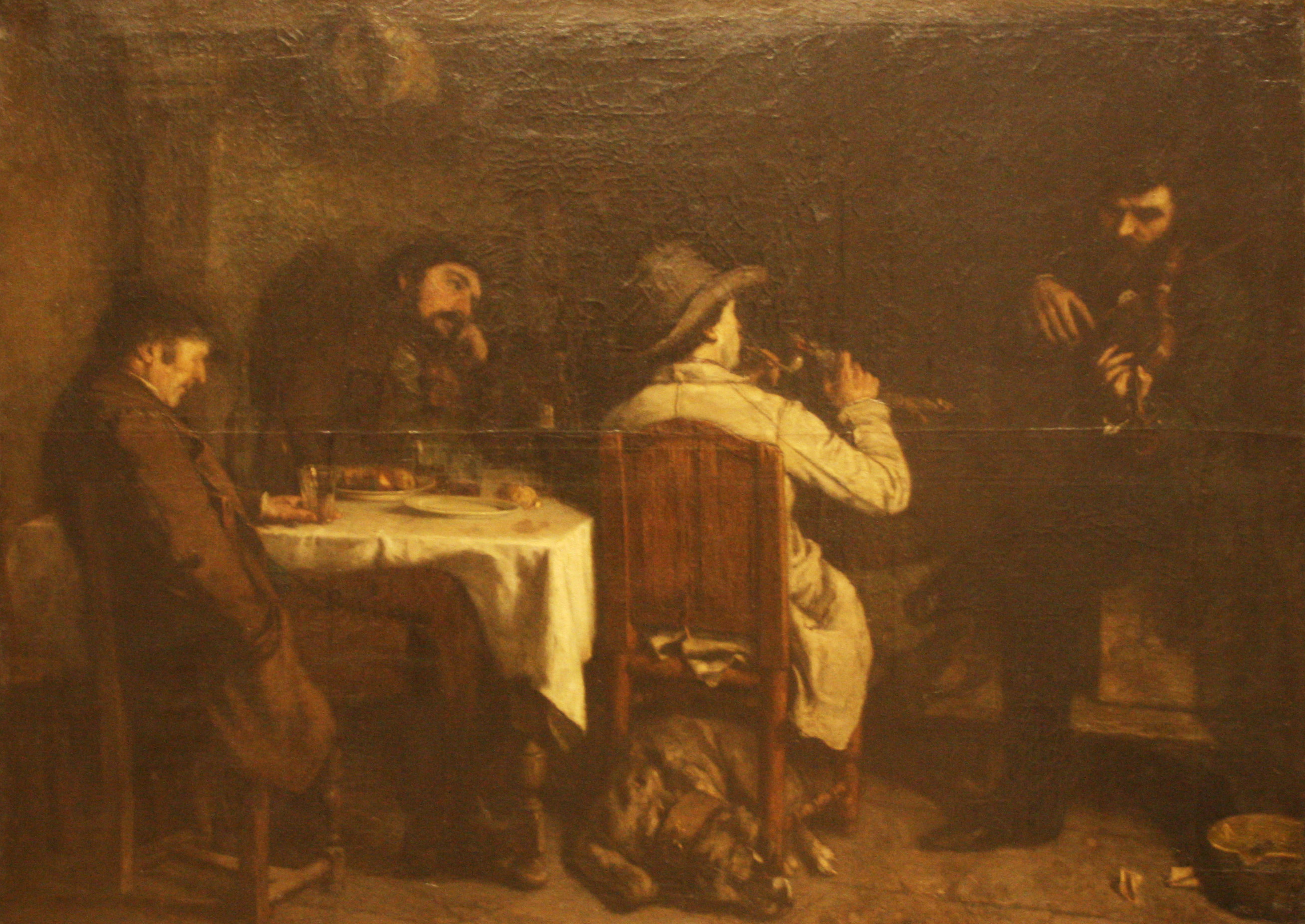
L’Après-dîner à Ornans by Gustave Courbet

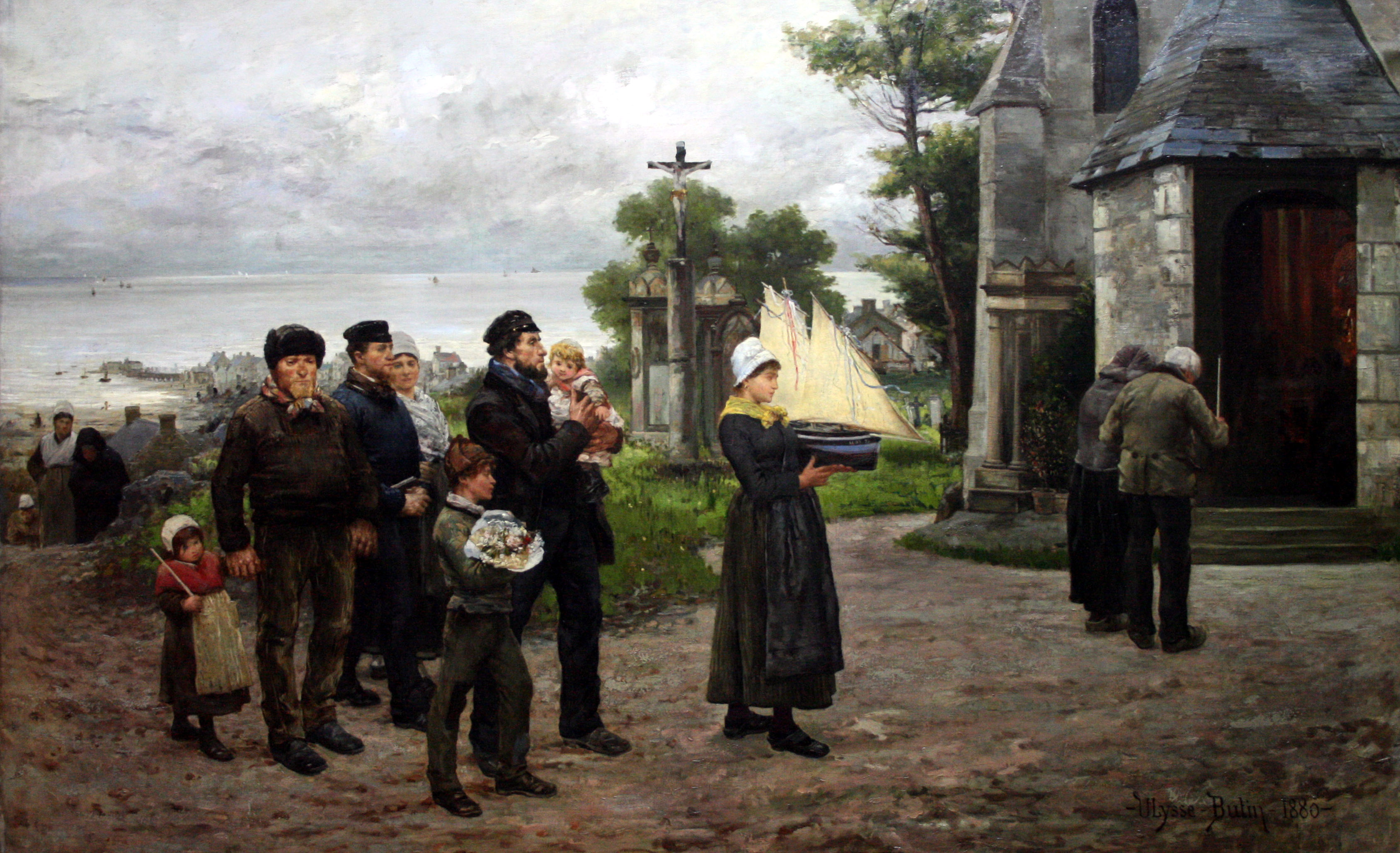
L'Ex-voto by Ulysse-Louis de Butin

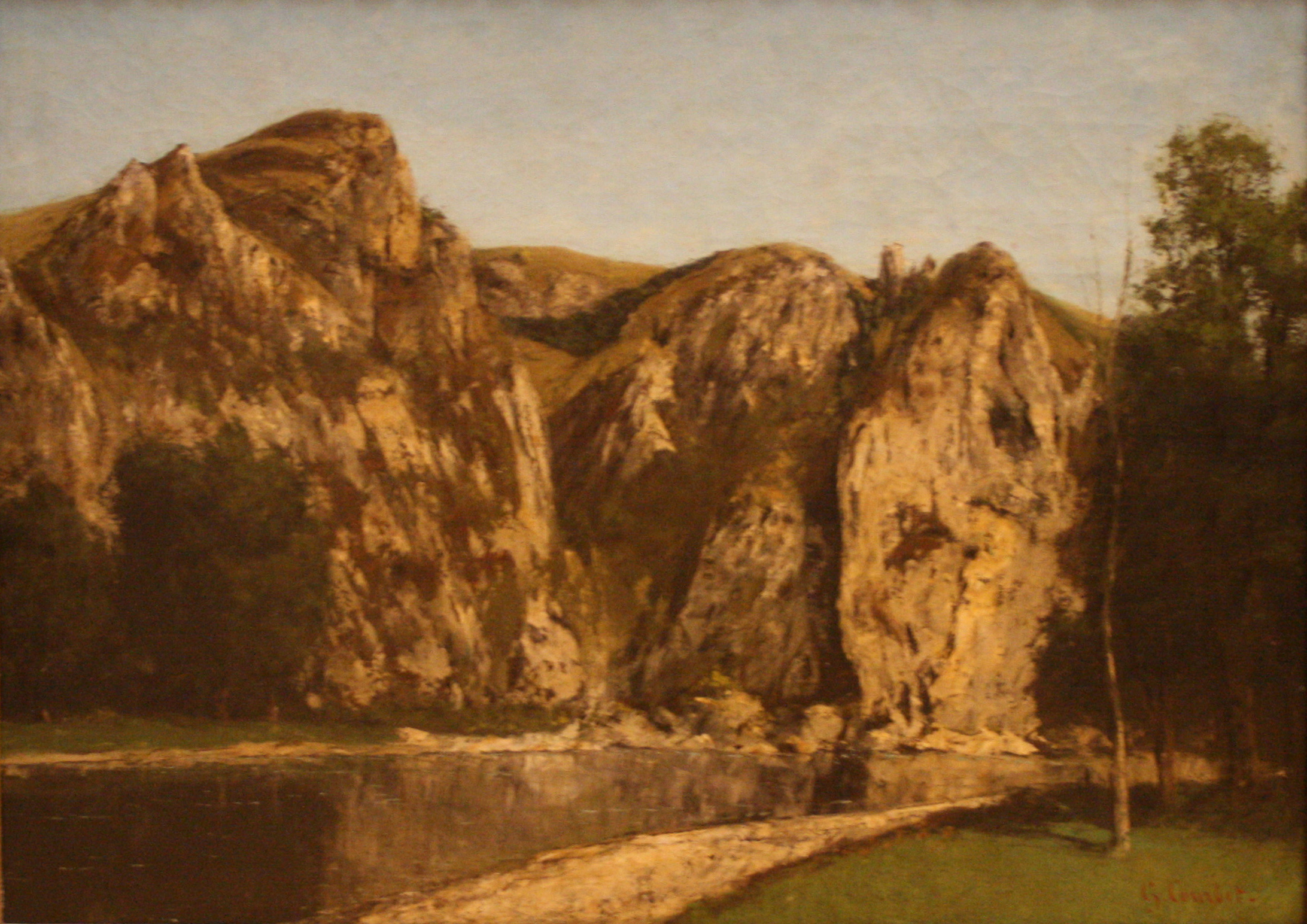
Meuse River in Freyr by Gustave Courbet

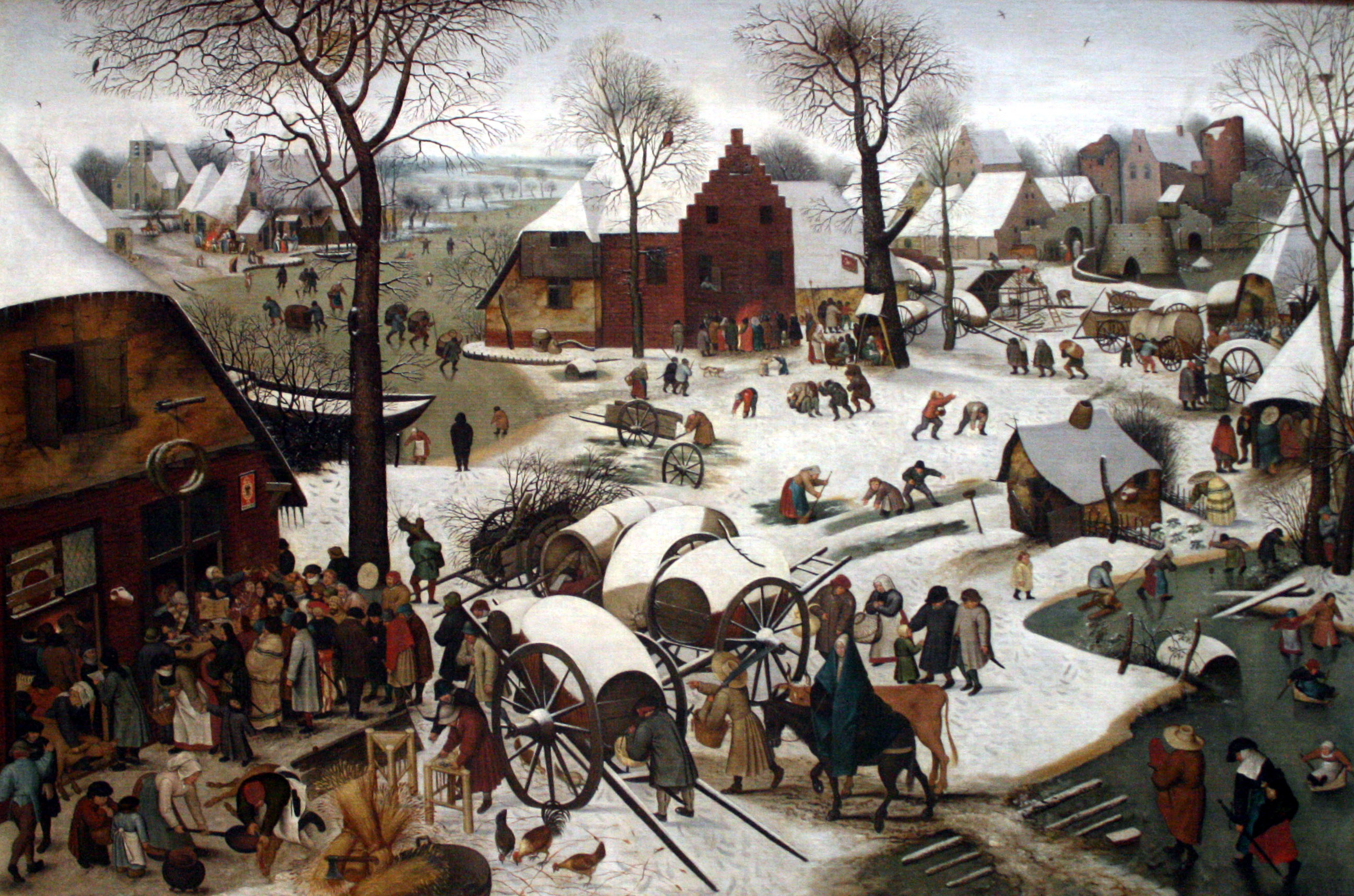
Le Dénombrement de Bethléem by Pieter Brueghel the Younger

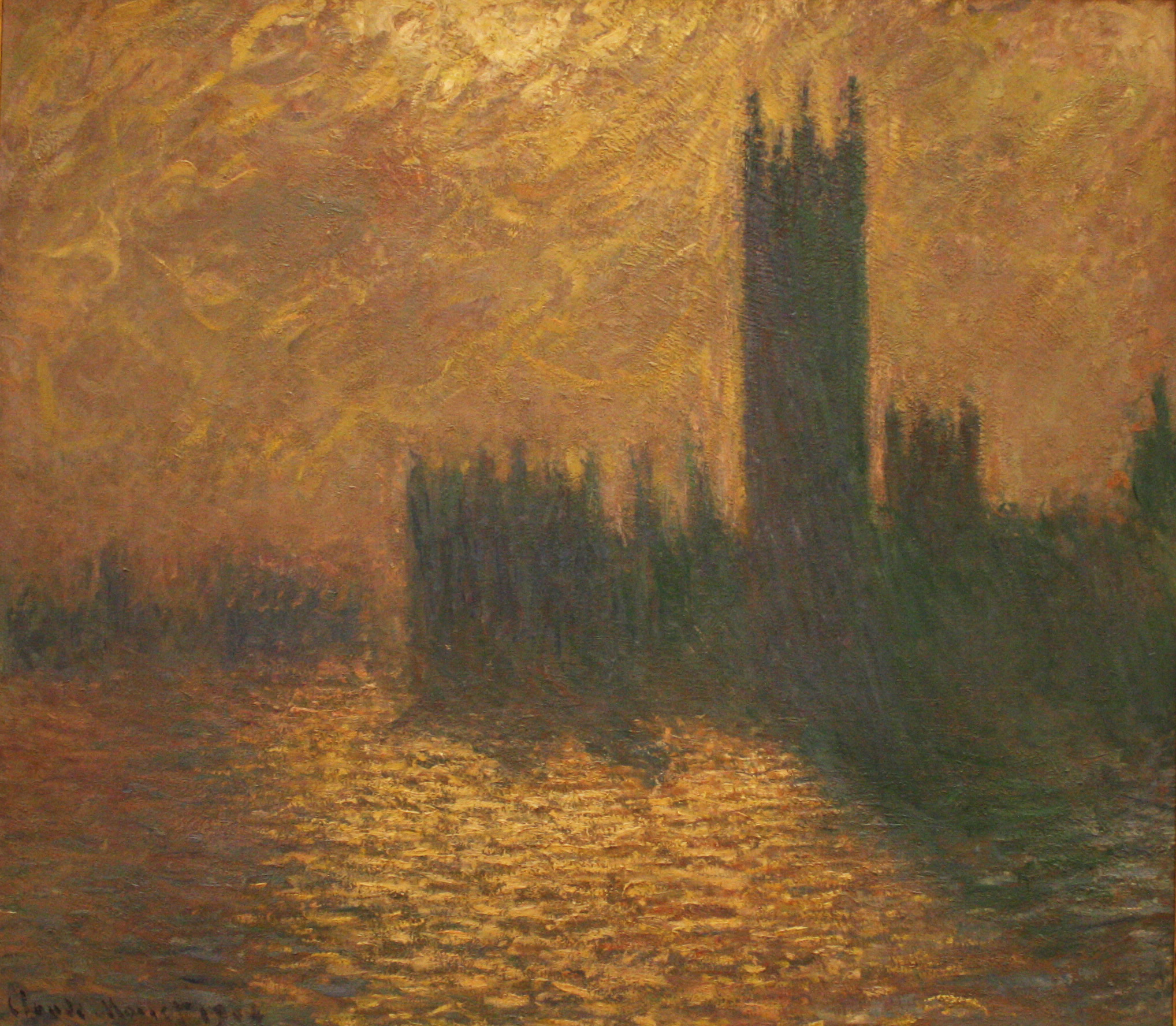
Houses of Parliament, London by Claude Monet

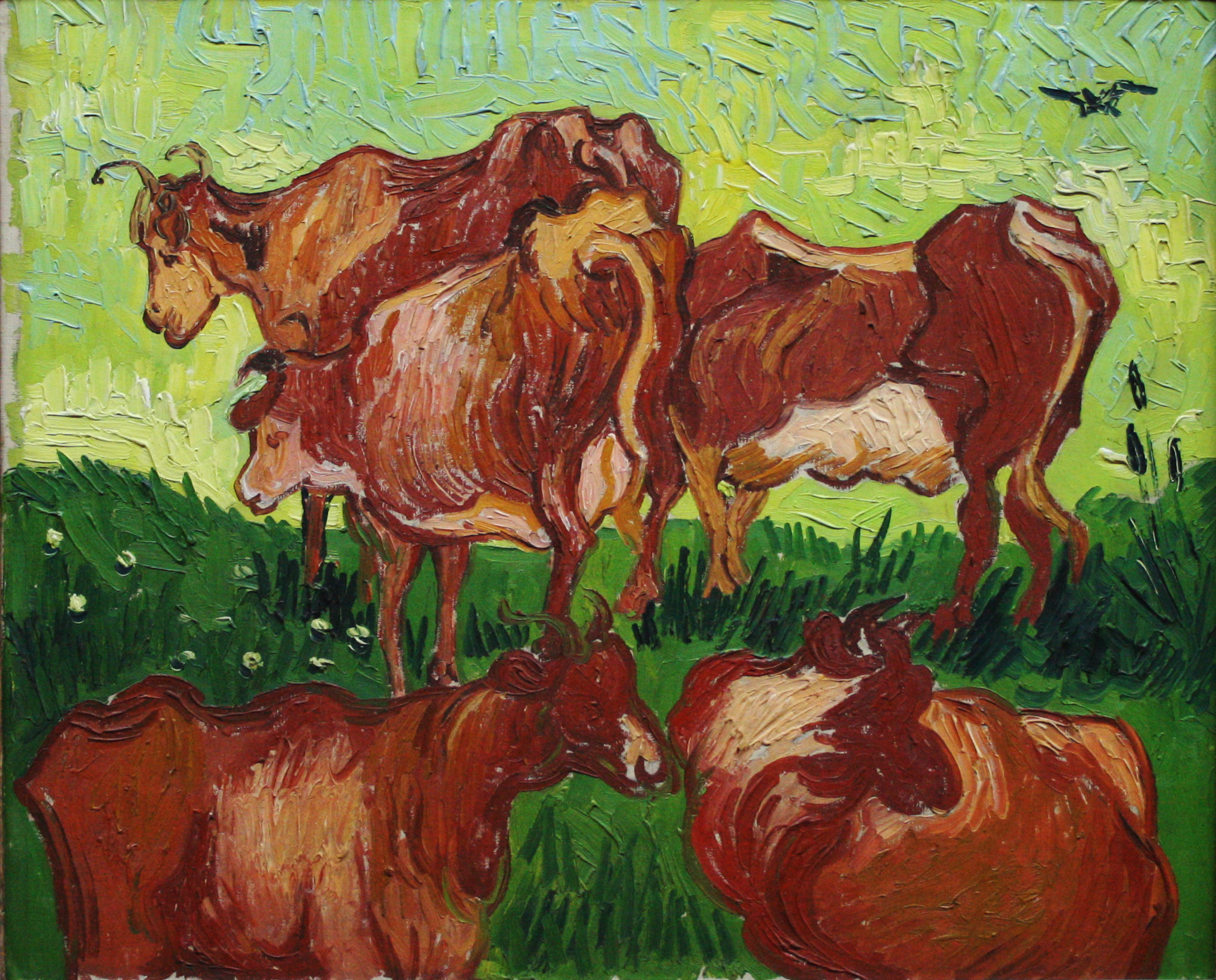
The Cows by Vincent van Gogh, 1890

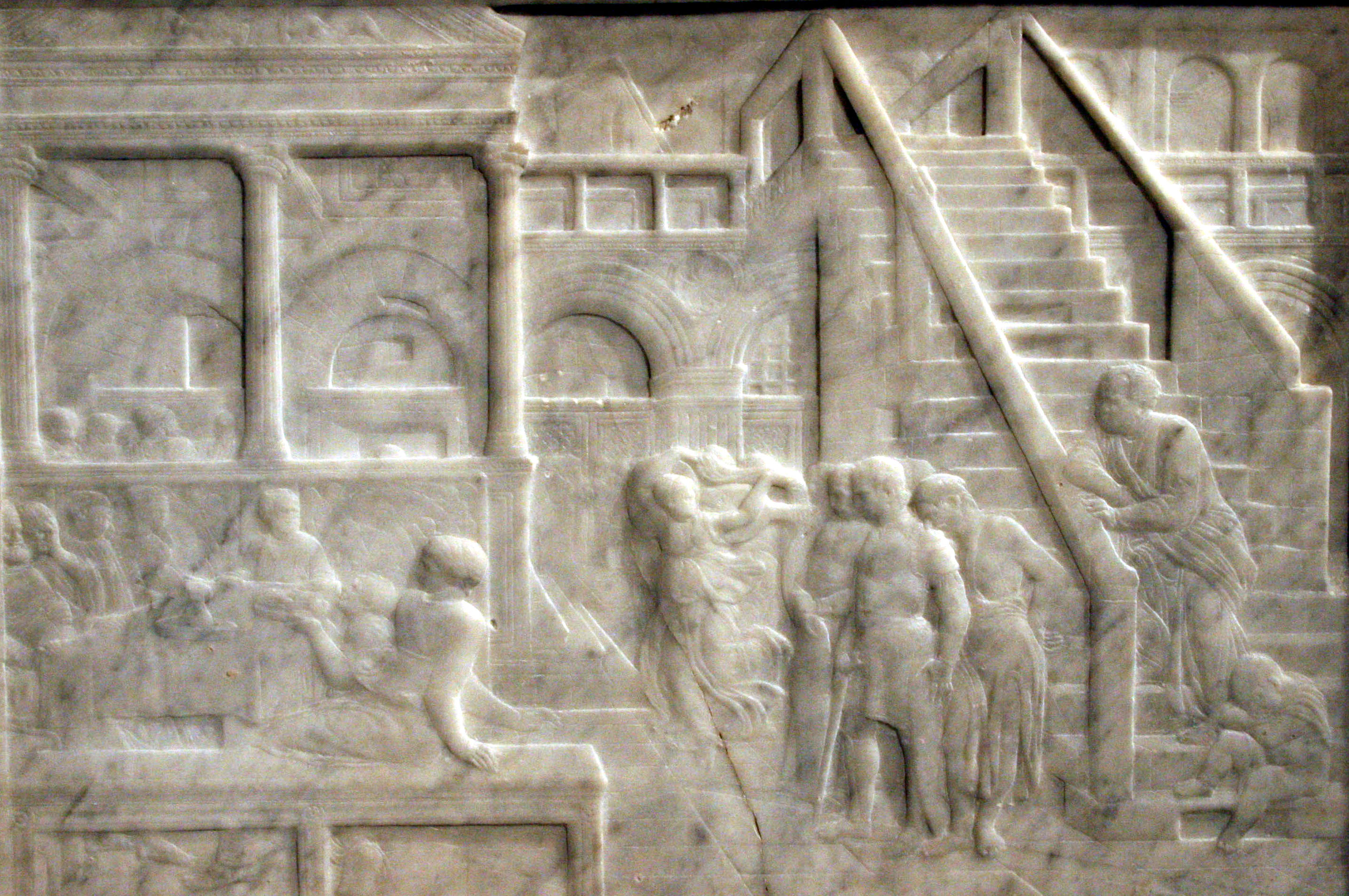
The Feast of Herod by Donatello

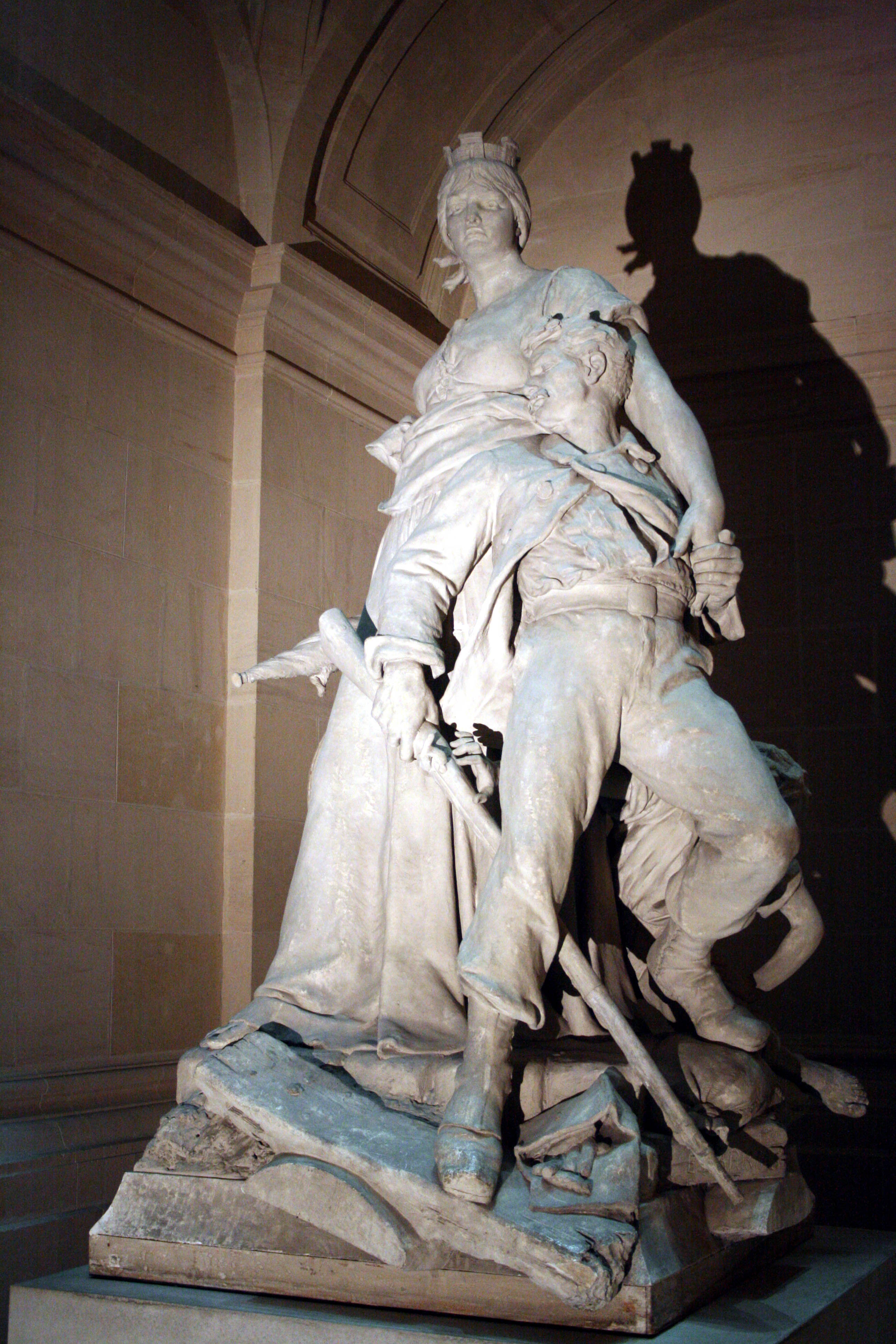
Monument de la défense de Saint-Quentin by Louis-Ernest Barrias

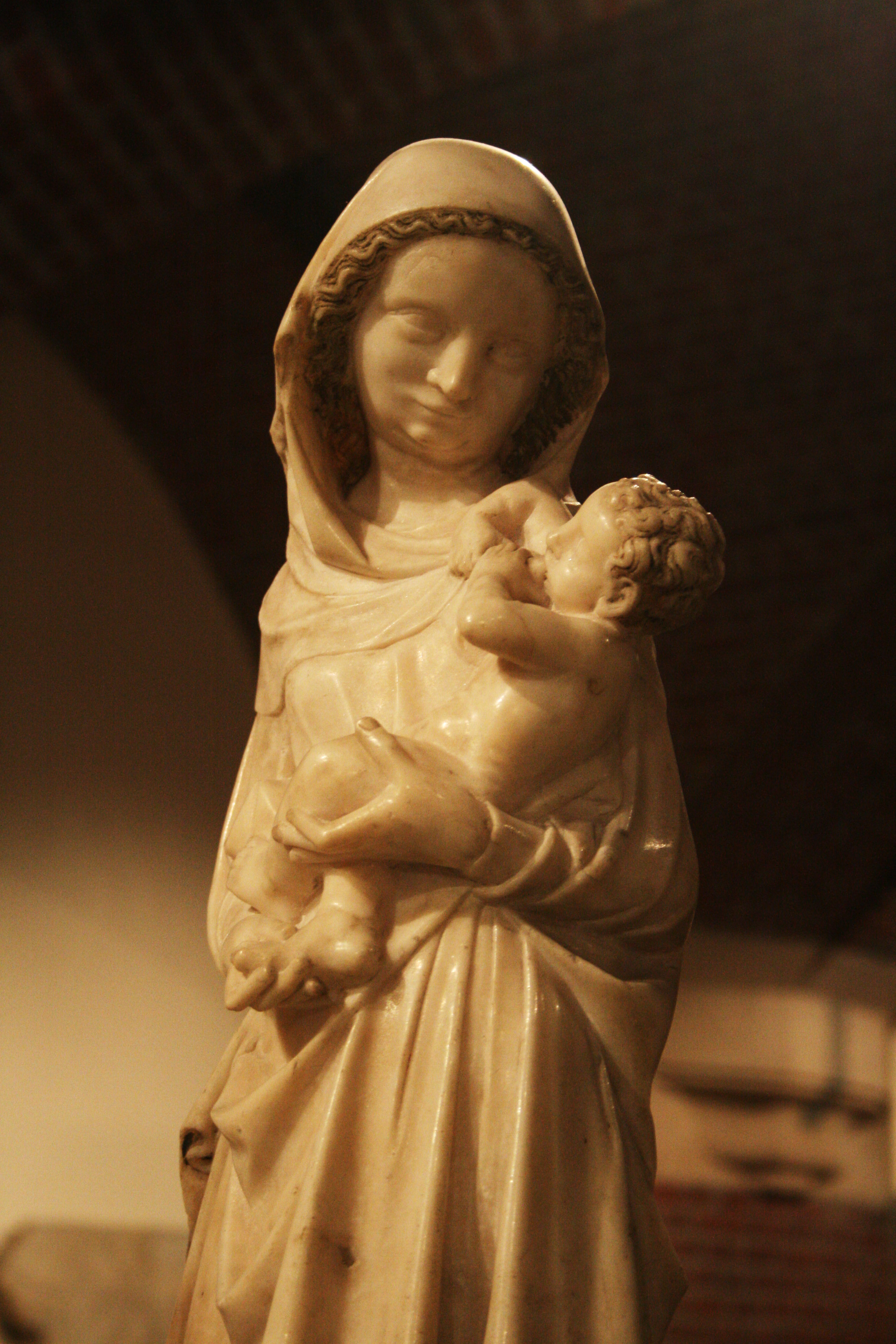
Vierge au lait by Maître des Madones mosanes

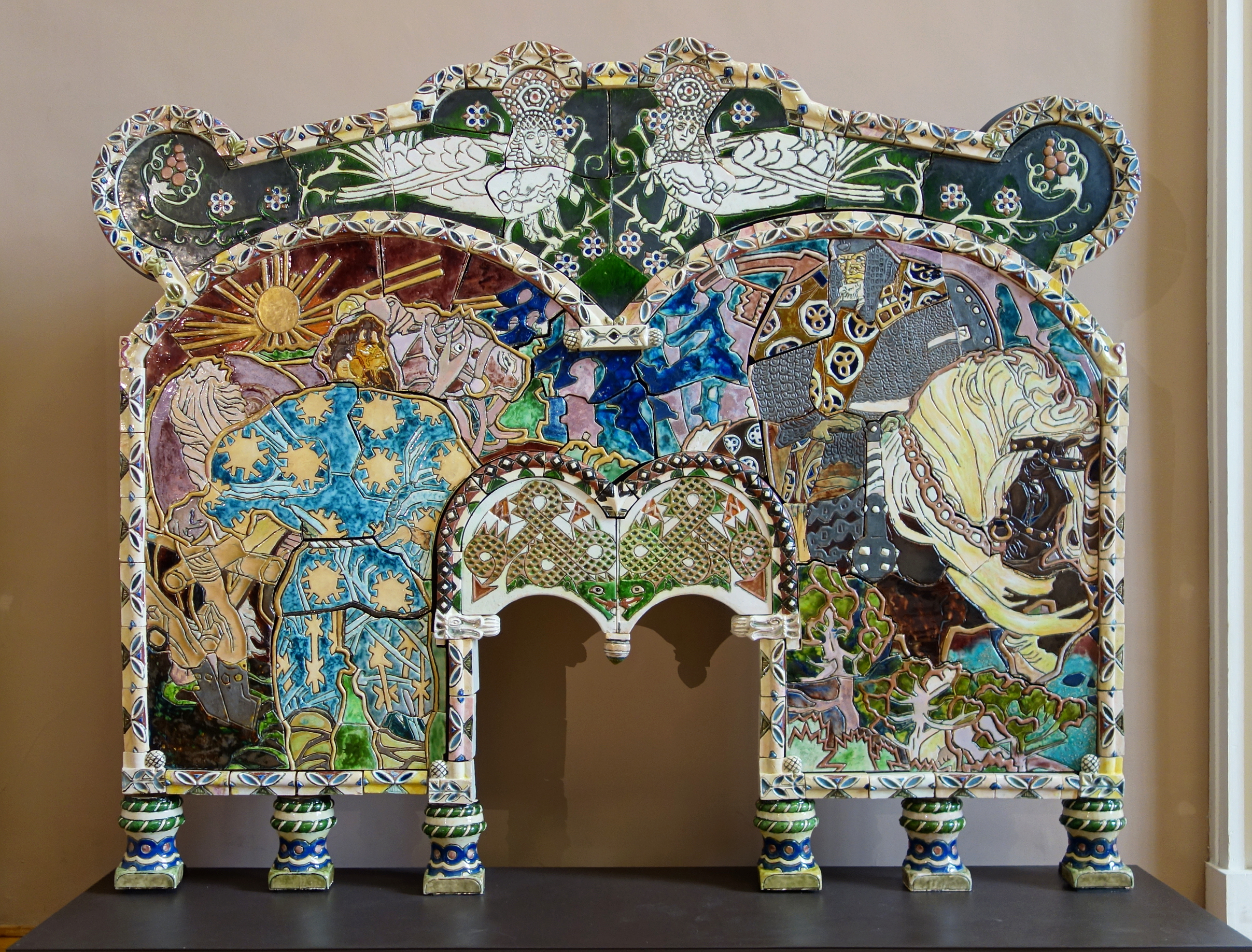
Volga Sviatoslavich and Mikula Selianinovich fireplace by Mikhail Vrubel

== Curator, director of the Palais des Beaux-Arts ==
- Bruno Girveau (present)
- Alain Tapié
- Arnaud Brejon de Lavergnée
- Albert Châtelet

== Expositions temporaires ==
- Goya: Les Caprices (1799), 24 April - 28 July 2008
- Philippe de Champaigne, 27 April - 15 August 2007 (his first retrospective)
- Rubens, 6 March-14 June 2004 (as part of Lille 2004)
- Carolus-Duran, 9 March - 9 June 2003
- Berthe Morisot, 10 March - 9 June 2002 (first European retrospective since 1961)
- Francisco de Goya, 15 December 1998 – 14 March 1999

== See also ==
- List of largest art museums

== Bibliography ==
- Le Palais des Beaux-Arts de Lille par Alain Tapié, Marie-Françoise Bouttemy, Annie Castier, et Dominique Delgrange aux éditions Réunion des musées nationaux, ISBN 2-7118-5222-9
- Les Plans en relief des places fortes du Nord : dans les collections du Palais des Beaux-Arts de Lille by Isabelle Warmoes, ISBN 2-85056-838-4
- Catalogue des dessins italiens : Collection du Palais des beaux-arts de Lille, aux éditions Réunion des musées nationaux, ISBN 2-7118-3392-5
