= Pieter Boel =

Flemish painter (1622–1674)

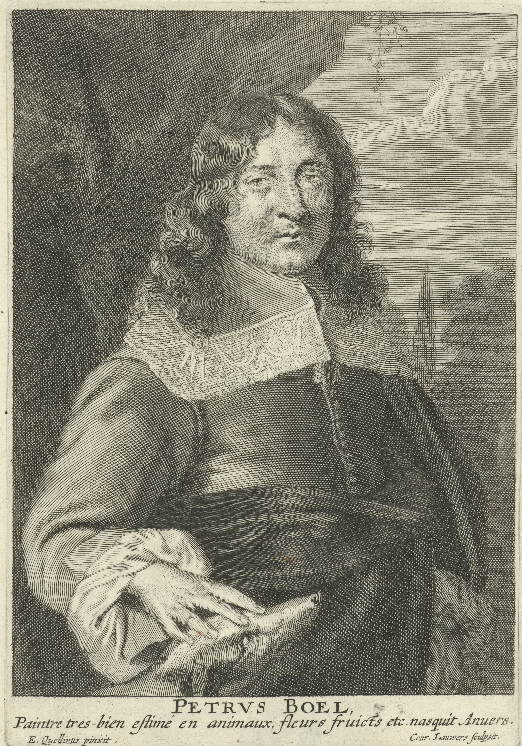
Pieter Boel after Erasmus Quellinus

Pieter Boel or Peeter Boel (baptized on 10 October 1622 – 3 September 1674) was a Flemish painter, printmaker and tapestry designer. He specialised in lavish still lifes and animal paintings. He moved to Paris, where he worked in the gobelin factory and became a painter to the king. Pieter Boel revolutionized animal painting by working directly from live animals in a natural setting. He thus arrived at representations of animals showing them in their natural, characteristic poses. He had many followers in France.

== Life ==
He was baptized in Antwerp on 10 October 1622 as the son of Jan Boel and Anna van der Straeten. He was member of a family of artists. His grandfather Jeroom had been a painter who was registered as a master in the Antwerp Guild of Saint Luke in 1620. His father was an engraver and his older brother Quirijn de Younger became an engraver. After studying drawing with his father he became a pupil of Jan Fijt, a well-known still life and animal painter. Jan Fijt had studied under the leading Flemish animal and still life painter Frans Snyders.

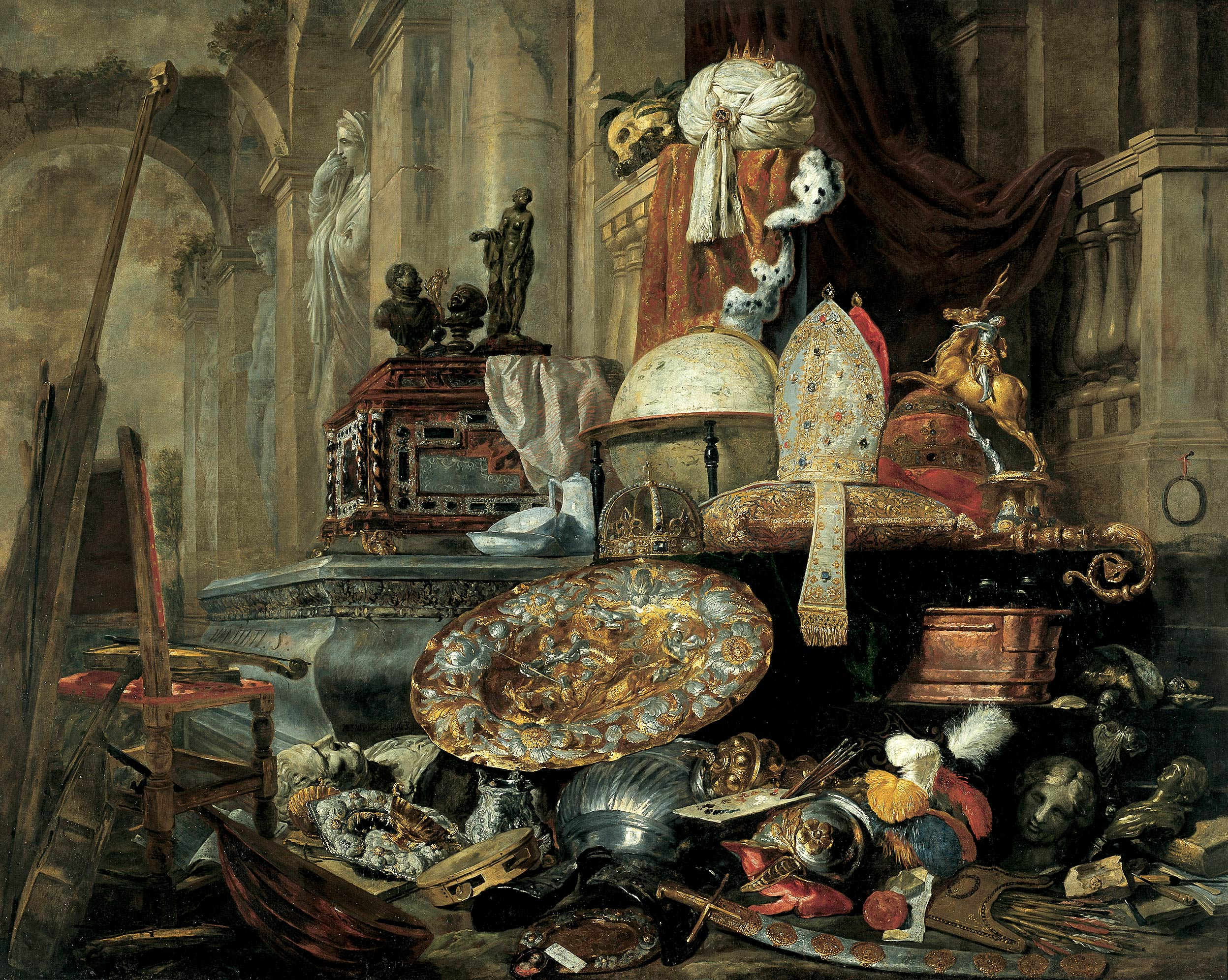
Allegory of the Vanities of the World, 1663

He is believed to have traveled to Italy in the 1640s or in 1651. His trip brought him to Genoa and Rome. In Genoa he stayed with fellow Antwerp painter and art dealer Cornelis de Wael who was a long-term resident that city and played a pivotal role in giving Flemish artists arriving in Genoa an opportunity to work. Boel later married de Wael's niece upon his return to Antwerp.

Upon his return to Antwerp, where he was registered in the local Guild of Saint Luke as a wijnmeester (wine master) (a title reserved for the children of members of the guild) in 1650–51. He married Maria Blanckaert, daughter of the painter Jan Blanckaert. His wife's mother was a sister of the painters and art dealers Cornelis de Wael (whom he knew from Genoa) and Lucas de Wael. Two of the couple's sons Jan Baptist Boel the Younger and Balthasar-Lucas Boel became artists.

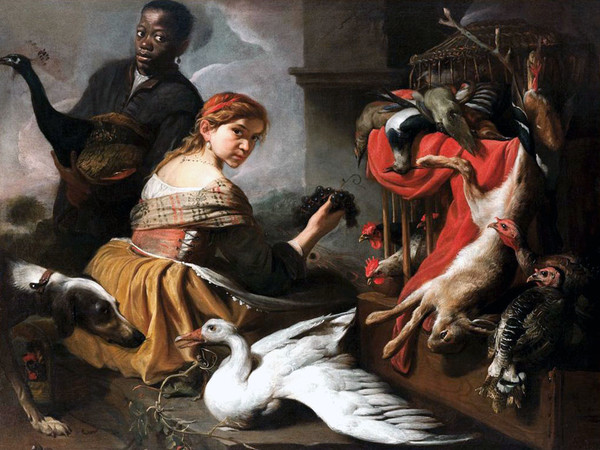
Moor with a peacock, young woman with grapes and dead game

By 1668–1669 he had moved to Paris where he formed part of the group of Flemish artists who had congregated around Charles Le Brun and resided at the Hôtel Royal des Gobelins. The court painter (Premier peintre du roi) Charles Le Brun had been put in charge of the Gobelins Manufactory, the royal tapestry works created in 1663 as well as the decoration of the various new buildings being constructed for the King. To realize these projects Le Brun surrounded himself with a large group of artists including a number of Flemish artists such as the sculptor Gerard van Opstal and the painters Adam Frans van der Meulen, Abraham Genoels, Adriaen Frans Boudewijns and Peter van Boucle. As a resident of the Hôtel Royal des Gobelins, Boel could practice his art without having to register with the local Guild of Saint Luke or the Académie royale de peinture et de sculpture. On three occasions, his name appears in the Comptes des Bâtiments du Roi (Accounts of the Royal Buildings), including for providing designs for the Gobelins tapestry works. Boel was closely related to two Flemish artists, who also lived at the Gobelins: Adam Frans van der Meulen and Gerard Scotin, an engraver. In 1671 he was a witness to the wedding of Scotin. Van der Meulen's wife was the second witness. Scotin engraved a number of Boel's designs of animals and may also have been the publisher of engravings made by Boel himself.

He was appointed peintre ordinaire (ordinary painter) by King Louis XIV in 1674. As the king's ordinary painter, Boel was commissioned to create 'paintings of various animals to be used in the tapestries of the Gobelins Manufactory. He died on 3 September 1674 of that year. Adam Frans van der Meulen was a witness in the burial act.

He was the teacher of his sons and David de Koninck.

== Work ==
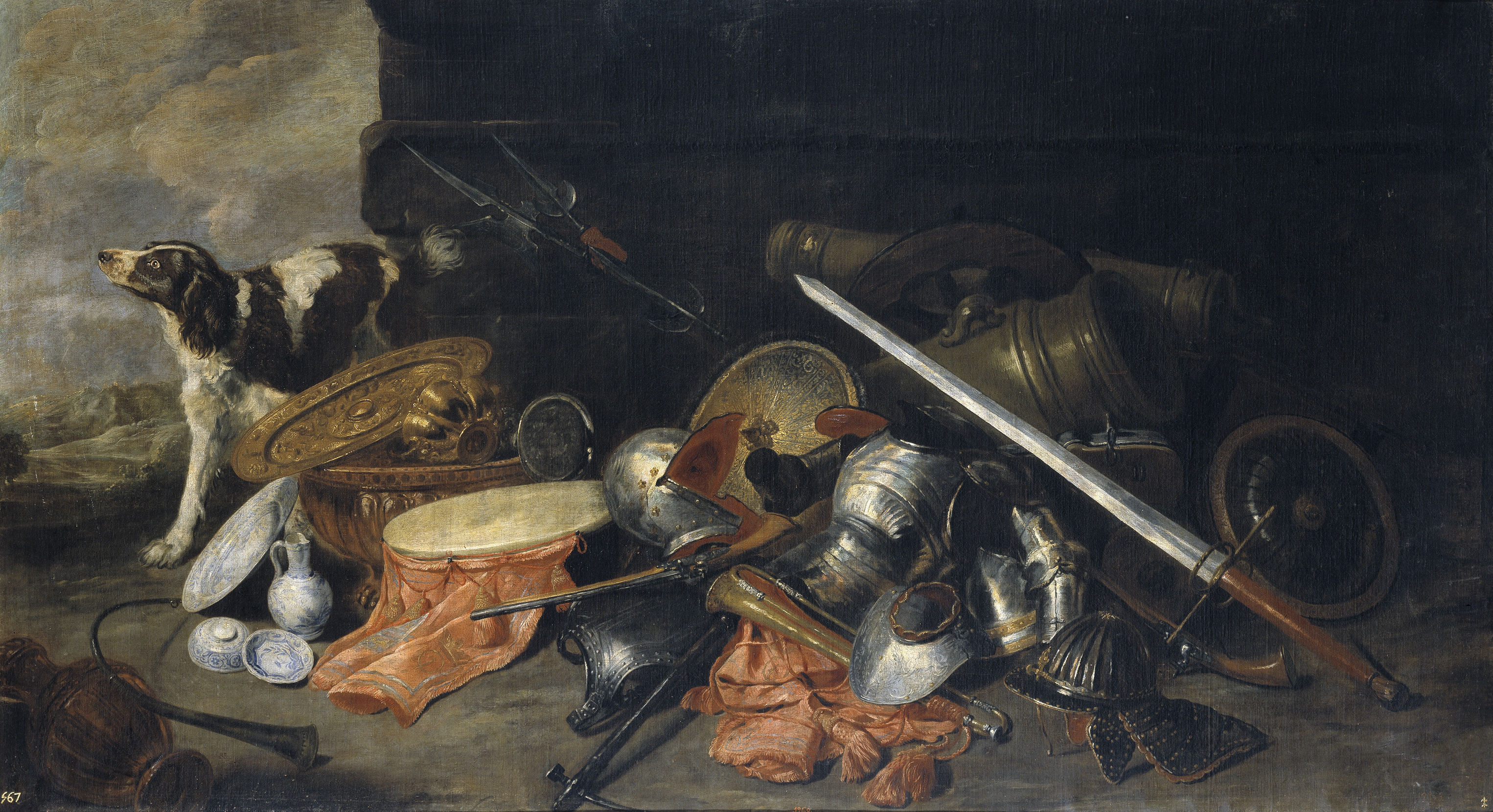
Arms and instruments of war

Boel principally painted still lifes including flower still lifes, hunting still lifes, animal and fish still lifes, vanitas paintings and still lifes of weapons. He also painted some landscapes. Since most of his works are undated, it is difficult to establish a chronology for his work. Boel achieved a very high quality in his work. It is believed that a number of his compositions may have had their signature removed so that they could pass as works by Frans Snyders or his master Jan Fijt. Only recently a number of still lifes in museums, which were formerly given to Fijt, have been re-attributed to Pieter Boel.

Boel follows to a large extent the style of his teacher Jan Fijt, in particular in his smaller compositions featuring a hare or a few birds in the open air. Boel's compositions differ from Fijt's works in their restraint and the smoother and more controlled handling of the paint. His palette also differs from Fijt's in his preference for accents of blue, red and pink.

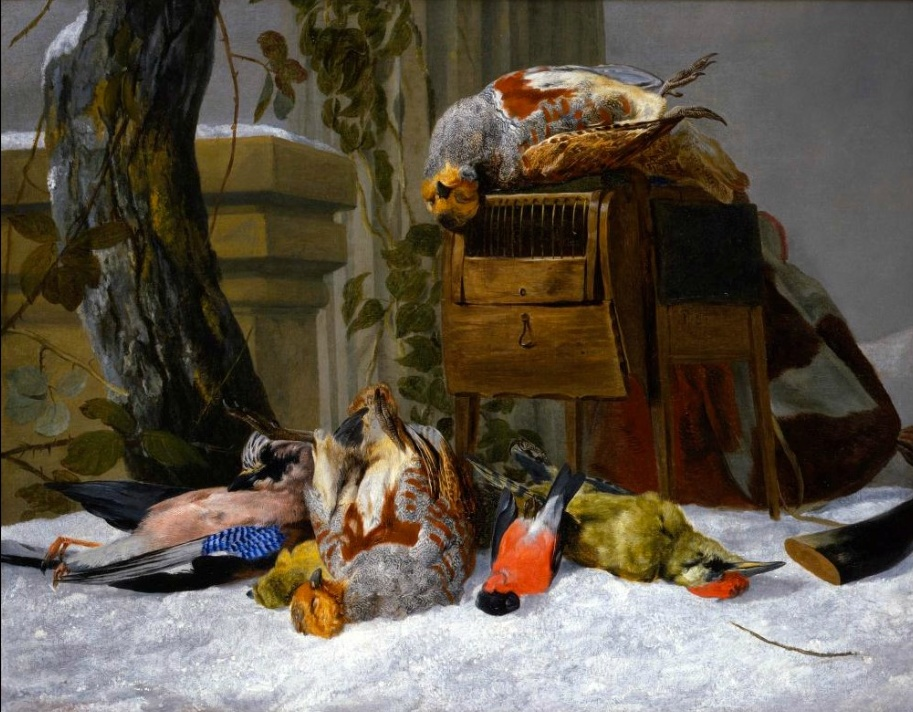
Still life with dead game and songbirds in the snow

During his stay in Italy Boel got to know the work of the Genoese artist Giovanni Benedetto Castiglione and the still life painter Giuseppe Recco. He learned from these Italian masters to heighten the dramatic effect of his canvases by emphasizing the shadows. He also used red drapes in the background, a Baroque element par excellence, to enhance the atmosphere of his compositions.

Boel is known to have collaborated with fellow Antwerp artists Erasmus Quellinus II and Jacob Jordaens, who painted the human figures in his compositions. Conversely, he also added still life elements to other artists' works. This is believed to be the case in the Portrait of the van de Werve Family (c. 1661, Auctioned at Sotheby's on 7 July 2005, London, lot 10) where Boel is believed to have added the still life on the left and the parrot in the portrait painted by Antwerp painter Pieter Thijs.

Boel was accomplished in large-scale vanitas paintings depicting an abundance of fruit, flowers, game and precious objects. His masterpiece in this genre is the Vanitas Still Life in the Palais des Beaux-Arts de Lille.

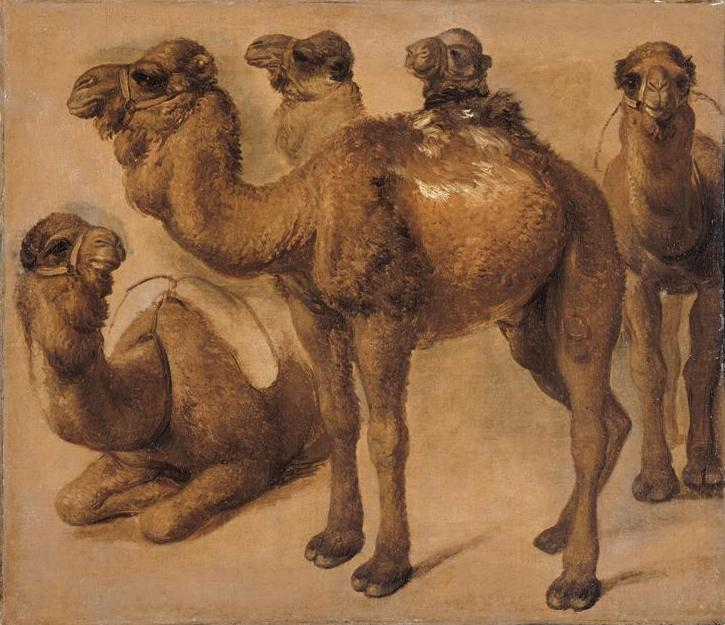
Study of camels

Pieter Boel revolutionized animal painting. Whereas artists had contented themselves before with making static studies from stuffed animals, Boel drew and painted his animals from life in the menagerie at Versailles. He thus represented animals in their natural poses and devoid of any emblematic or similar preconceived notion of the animals. His way of portraying animals has been described as sympathetic with the animals. This was not in line with the prevailing view of animals as simple machines or beasts. His naturalism influenced a long line of great animal artists, from the painter Jean-Baptiste Oudry to the sculptor Antoine-Louis Barye. Boel was particularly adapt at rendering various textures, especially feathers.

His animal studies were used as models for the animals appearing in the borders and foreground of a series of large tapestries, referred to as 'The Months' or 'The Royal Houses' (Maisons Royales) produced at the Gobelins tapestry workshop. Each of the tapestries represents a different royal residence. Conscious of the value of Boel's animal repertoire, the Gobelins workshop kept the entire set of Boel's painted and drawn studies numbering 81 in total. They represent mammals, birds, a tortoise, a lobster and a lizard. They are painted against a red or pink background. He painted the fur, plumage, paws and eyes of the animals with a free brush. The same animal is in some studies represented in different positions. The species are mixed in studies, but it is rare for furry animals and animals with plumage to be included in the same study. The French painter François Desportes copied several of his paintings and as a result, it was believed that the original drawings were by Desportes. It is only after it was confirmed that the originals had been made by Boel that Boel's reputation as an animal painter was re-established. Charles Le Brun used Boel's studies for his own works.
