= Allegory of the Vanities of the World =

1663 painting by Pieter Boel

Allegory of Vanities of the World
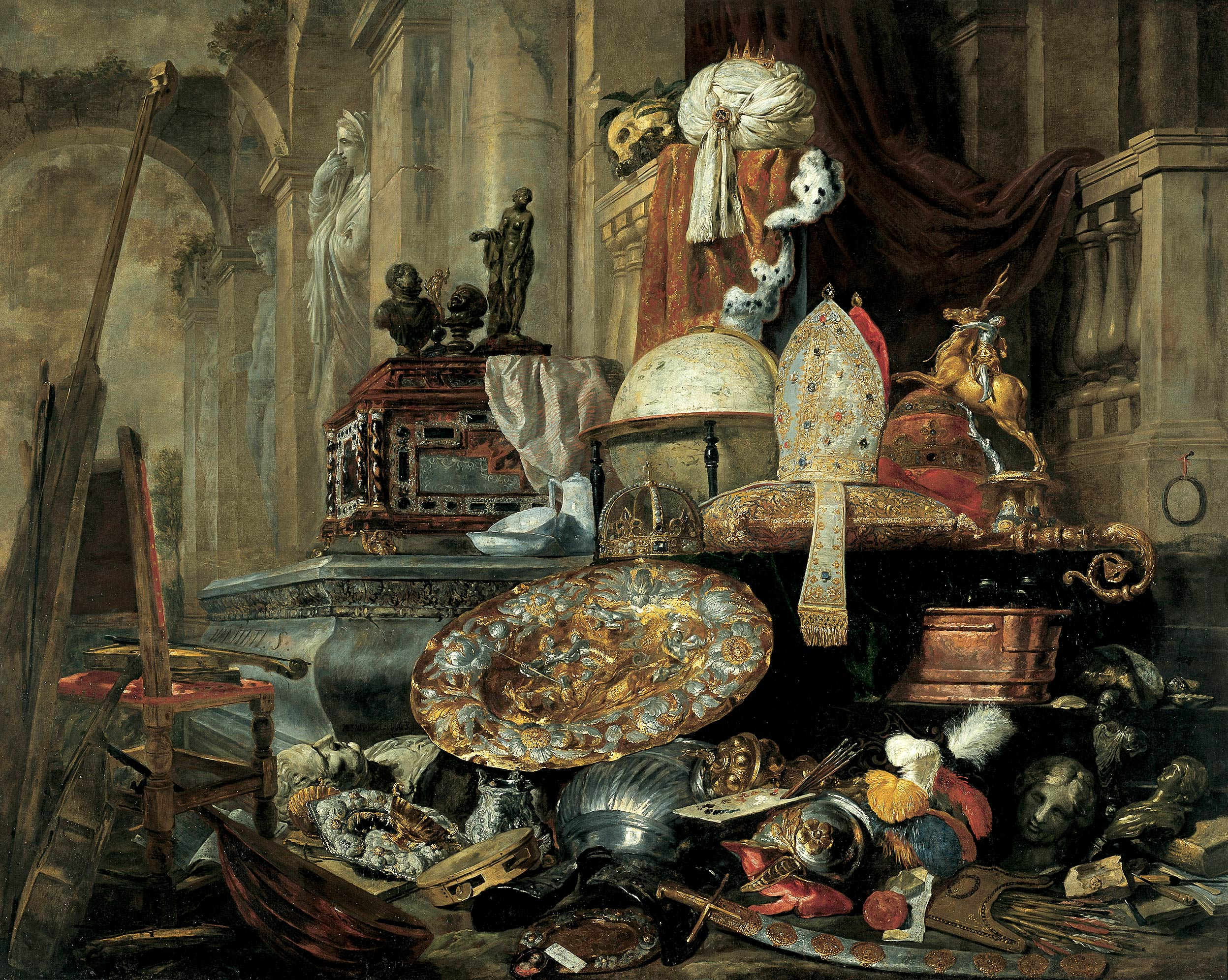
- Artist: Pieter Boel
- Year: 1663
- Medium: oil on canvas
- Dimensions: 207,5 cm × 260 cm (817 in × 100 in)
- Location: Palais des Beaux-Arts de Lille, Lille

Allegory of the Vanities of the World is a 1663 painting by the Flemish painter Pieter Boel, now in the Palais des Beaux-Arts de Lille. It is unusually large for a vanitas painting.

It shows symbols of art (music, sculpture and painting), glory (armour, sabre, bow and arrows), temporal power (Christian or Muslim crowns), spiritual power (tiara and cross), wealth (copper, silver, gold, furs and precious textiles), knowledge (globe and books), all heaped as a pyramid in a ruined palace or church. Atop the pile stands a crane crowned with laurels. To the right a circlet of iron, without beginning or end, symbolises eternity. In the background a sarcophagus is inscribed "Vanitati S" (sacrifice of Vanity).
