= Suleiman Aga =

Ottoman ambassador to France

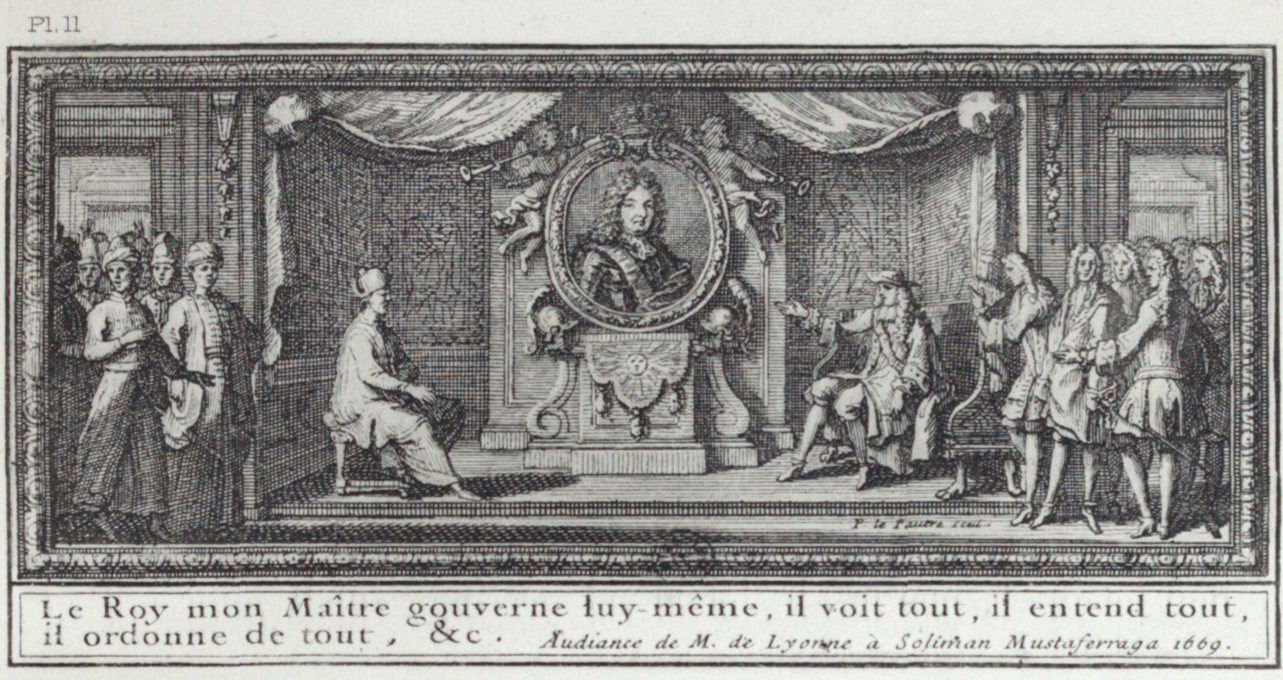
Suleiman Aga to the left meeting with Hugues de Lionne, to the right

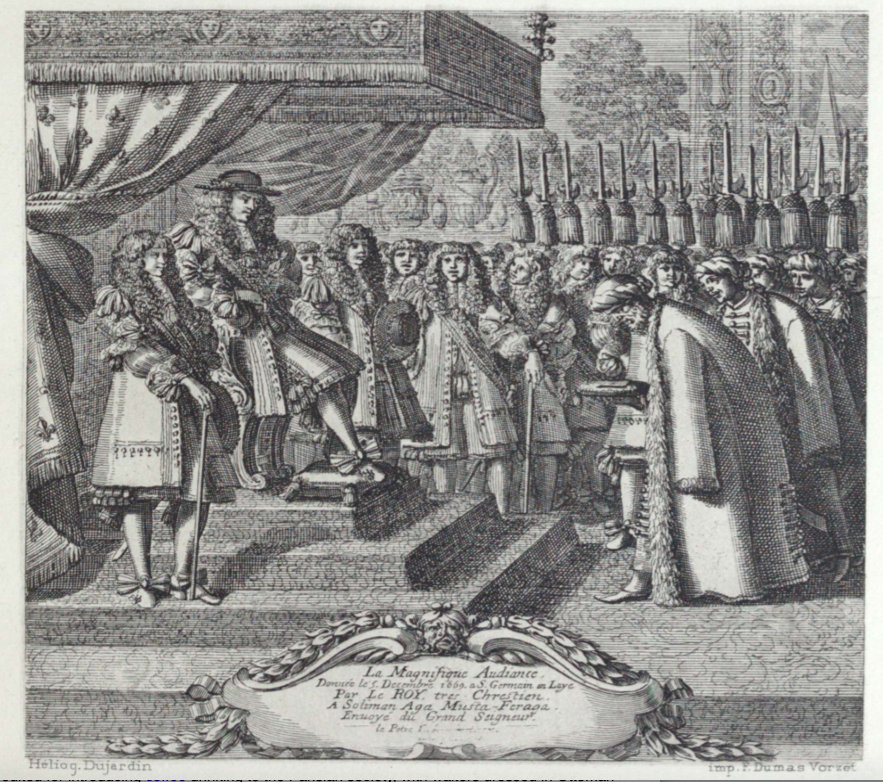
Suleiman Aga in 1669, in front of Louis XIV

Müteferrika Süleyman Ağa, known as Suleiman Aga and Soleiman Agha in France, was an Ottoman ambassador to the French king Louis XIV in 1669. When Suleiman visited Versailles, he wore a simple wool coat and refused to bow to Louis XIV, who immediately banished him from Versailles to Paris.

In Paris, Suleiman set up a house where he was credited for introducing coffee drinking to the Parisian society, with waiters dressed in Ottoman style, starting the fashion for coffee-drinking. Suleiman invited Parisian society women to his home for extravagant "coffee ceremonies", which were imitated throughout Parisian high society.

Suleiman's activities in Paris were a trigger for the popularity of Turquerie and Orientalism in early modern France, in which Turkish fashions of the time such as turbans and caftans and decorations such as carpets and cushions became highly popular.

The first French coffee shop, the Café Procope, opened in 1689, 17 years after Suleiman's famed visit.

== See also ==
- Franco-Ottoman alliance
- Charles Marie François Olier, marquis de Nointel
- Le Bourgeois gentilhomme
