= The Triumph of Marat =

Painting by Louis-Léopold Boilly

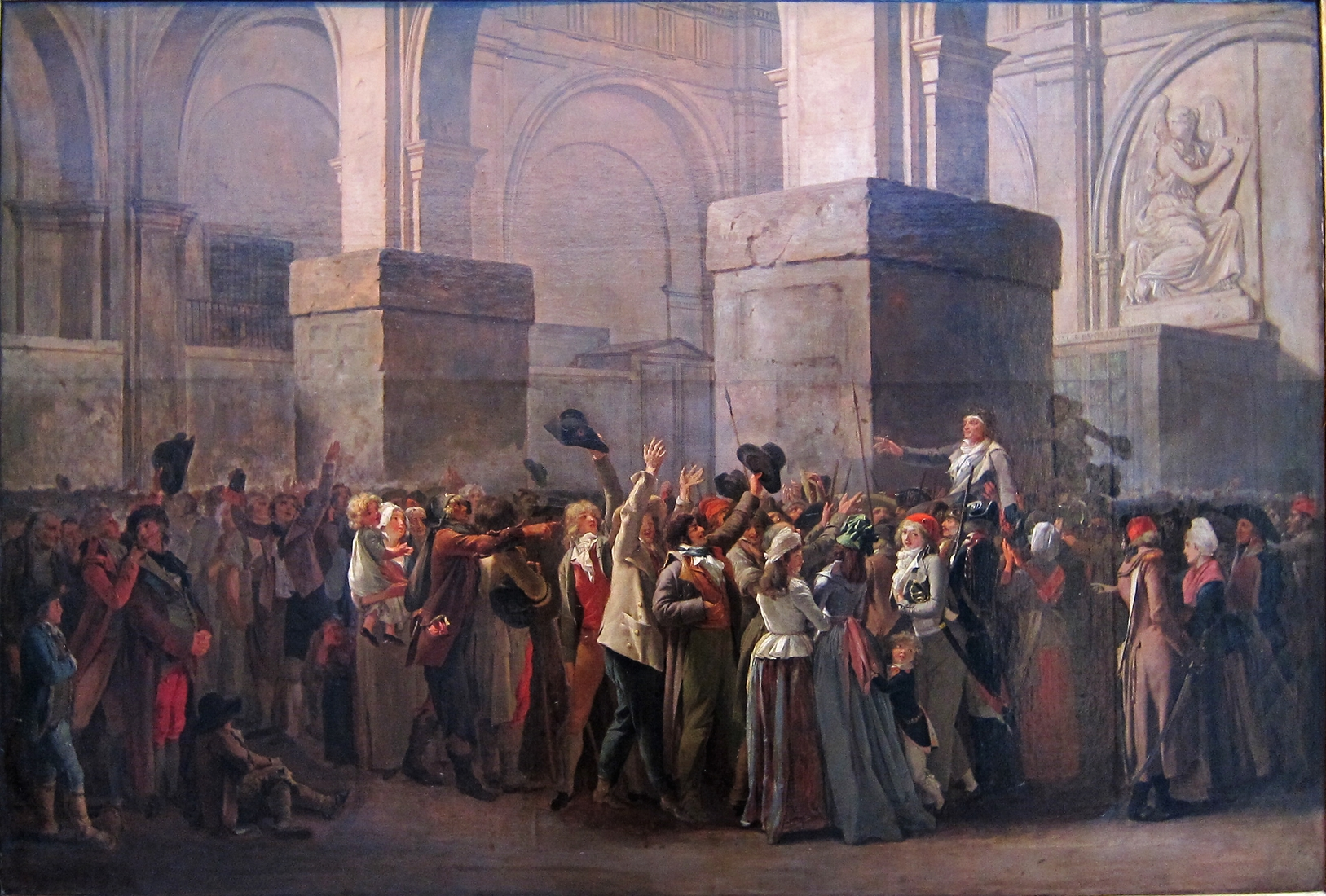
- Artist: Louis-Léopold Boilly
- Year: 1794
- Type: Oil on canvas, history painting
- Dimensions: 80 cm × 120 cm (31 in × 47 in)
- Location: Palais des Beaux-Arts de Lille; Lille

The Triumph of Marat (French: Le Triomphe de Marat) is an oil-on-canvas history painting by the French artist Louis-Léopold Boilly, completed in 1794. It is in the collection of the Palais des Beaux-Arts de Lille, having been acquired in 1865.

== History and description ==
It depicts the moment on 24 April 1793 when Jean-Paul Marat, a leader of the French Revolution, was acquitted by a Revolutionary Tribunal. He had been accused by the National Convention of insurrection against the Girondins. Boilly shows Marat being carried by a cheering crowd of supporters, both men and women, through the Salle des Pas Perdus of the Palais de la Cité. In July of the same year, Marat was assassinated by Charlotte Corday the sympathiser of Girondin, leading to the Reign of Terror.

Having moved to Paris a few years before the revolution, Boilly was able to exhibit paintings at the Paris Salon at the Louvre for the first time at the Salon of 1791. He exhibited further works at the Salon of 1793 but in 1794 at the height of the Terror he was denounced for producing obscene, anti-republican art. He responded by producing a patriotic work celebrating a revolutionary hero. It also marked a shift in his work towards crowd scenes, for which he would later become well known.

== Bibliography ==
- Duby, Georges & Perrot, Michelle. A History of Women in the West: Renaissance and Enlightenment Paradoxes. Harvard University Press, 1992.
- Whitlum-Cooper, Francesca. Boilly: Scenes of Parisian Life. National Gallery Company, 2019.
