= Albert Vandal =

French historian

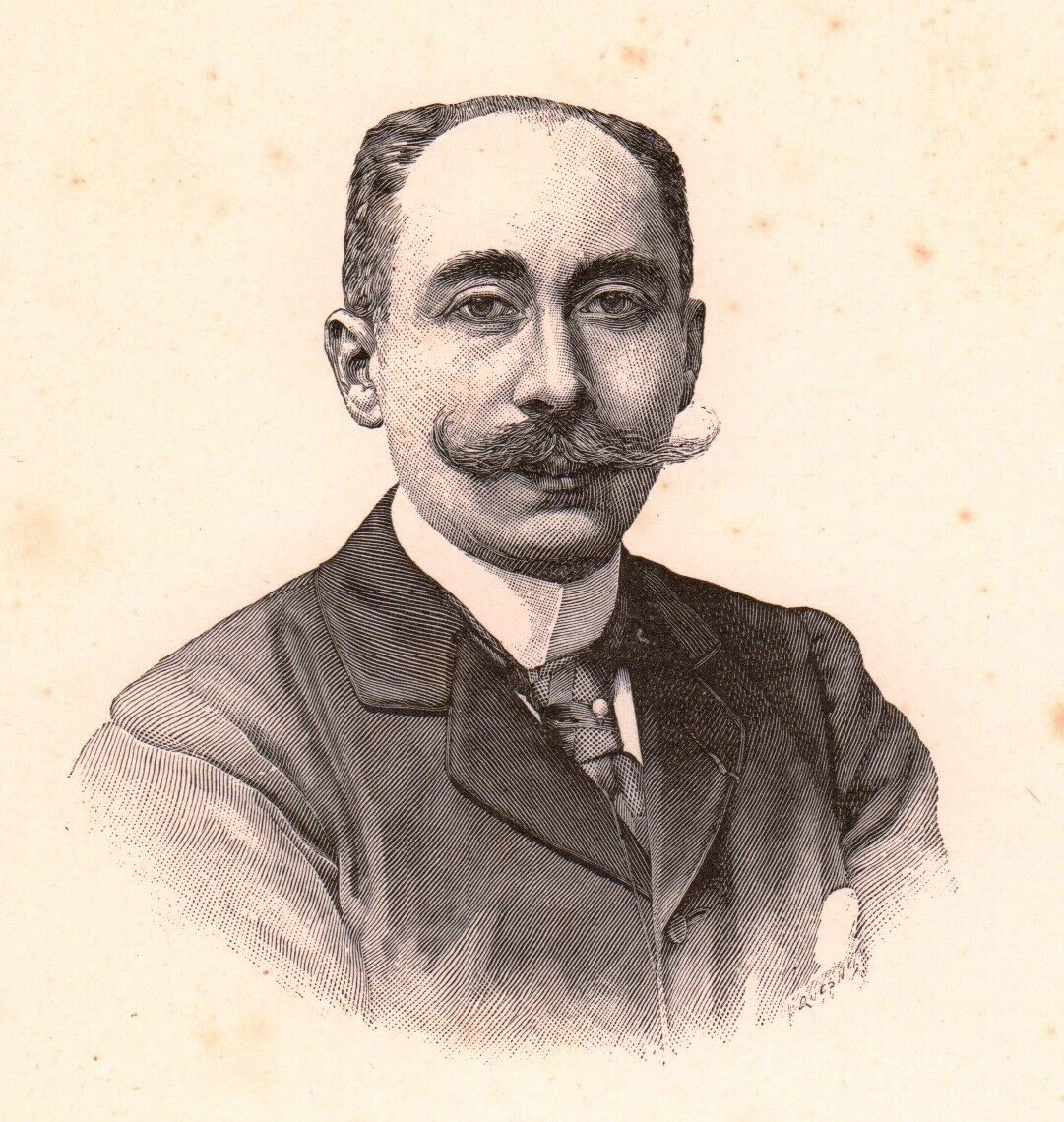
Albert Vandal.

Albert Count Vandal (7 July 1853, Paris – 30 August 1910, Paris) was a French historian. He wrote:

- En karriole à travers la Suède et la Norvège (1876)
- Louis XV et Elizabeth de Russie (1882)
- Ambassade française en Orient sous Louis XV (1887)
- Napoléon et Alexandre Ier (three volumes, 1894-97), awarded the Vaubert prize
- Les voyages du Marquis de Nointel (1900)
- L'avènement de Bonaparte (1902)

Vandal was elected to the Académie française in 1897, and he succeeded his teacher and friend, Albert Sorel as professor at the school of political science.
