= Anchin Abbey =

Abbey in Nord, France

- L'abbaye d'Anchin
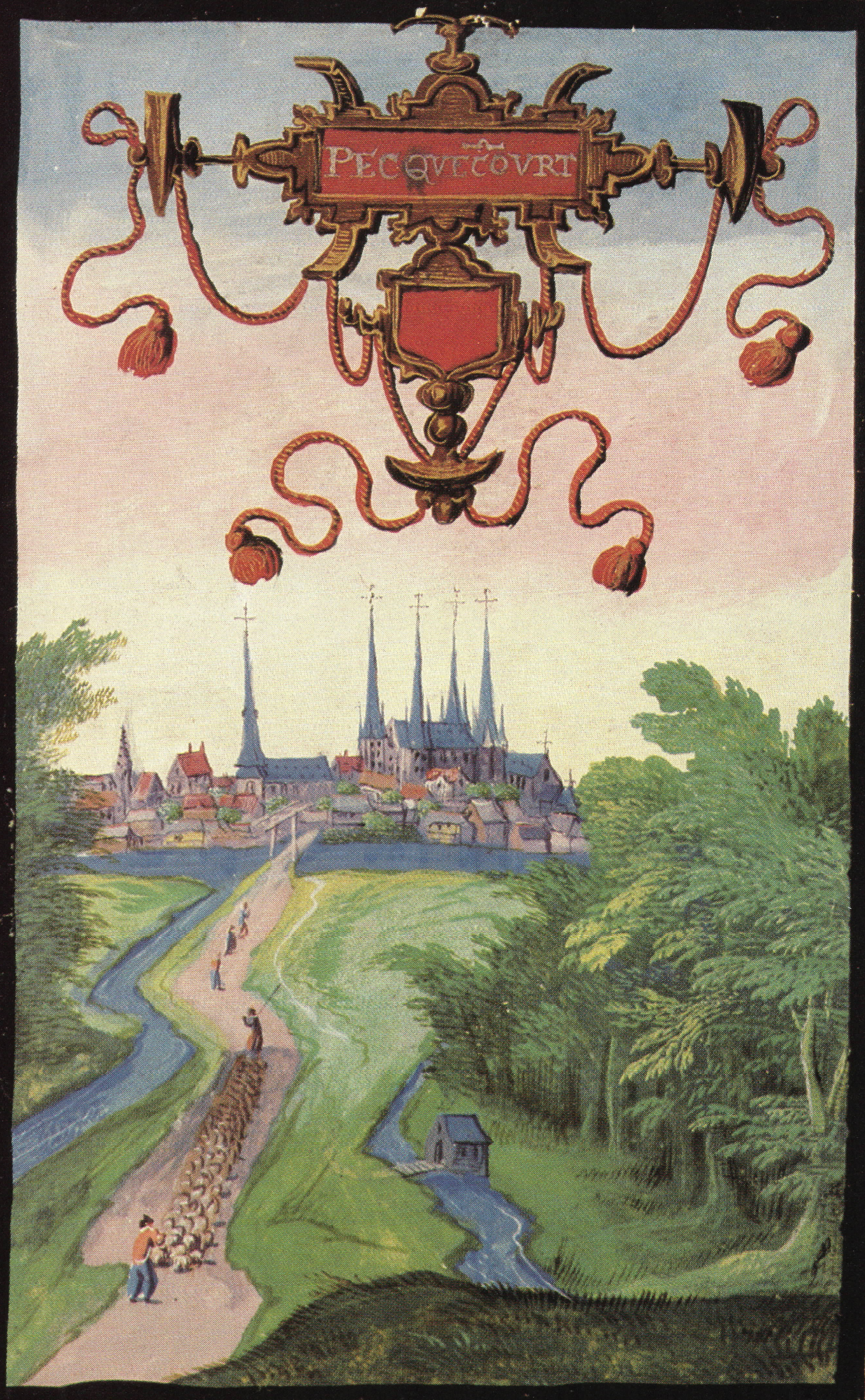
- A sixteenth-century view of the abbey designed by Adrien de Montigny.

- Location within France

Monastery information
- Order: Benedictine
- Established: 1079
- Disestablished: 1790

Architecture
- Status: Monument historique

Site
- Coordinates: 50.384069°N 3.219549°E

Anchin Abbey was a Benedictine monastery founded in 1079 in the commune of Pecquencourt in what is now the Nord department of France.

== Geography ==
Aquicintum then Aquacignium, Anchin (or Chisho) is an island of 25 hectares, part of the territory of Pecquencourt and surrounded by marshes, the river Scarpe and the stream of Bouchart.

Coat of Arms of Anchin Abbey: "Azure semy de lis or, overall a stag passant argent.".

== History ==
Aquicintum, later Aquacignium and then Anchin (or Enchin), was a 25 hectare island forming part of the territory of Pecquencourt, between the marais, the river Scarpe and the Bouchart brook.

The hermit and confessor Gordaine built his hermitage on the island in the 8th century and is sometimes considered the abbey's founder: an anonymous 17th-century painting in the church of Saint-Gilles at Pecquencourt shows his miracles.

In 1096, the abbey was the site of a large tournament, the Tournoi d'Anchin, at which 300 knights from Ostrevent, Hainaut, Cambrésis and Artois fought. An important cultural centre from the 11th to 13th centuries, it produced many manuscripts and charters.

In 1562, Anchin College (now the Lycée Albert-Châtelet) was built by the Jesuits under the abbey's patronage. It was suppressed in the French Revolution, declared state property by the decree of 28 October 1790, sold to François-Joseph Tassart of Douai on 27 March 1792 for 47,700 livres and demolished later that year.

== Architecture ==
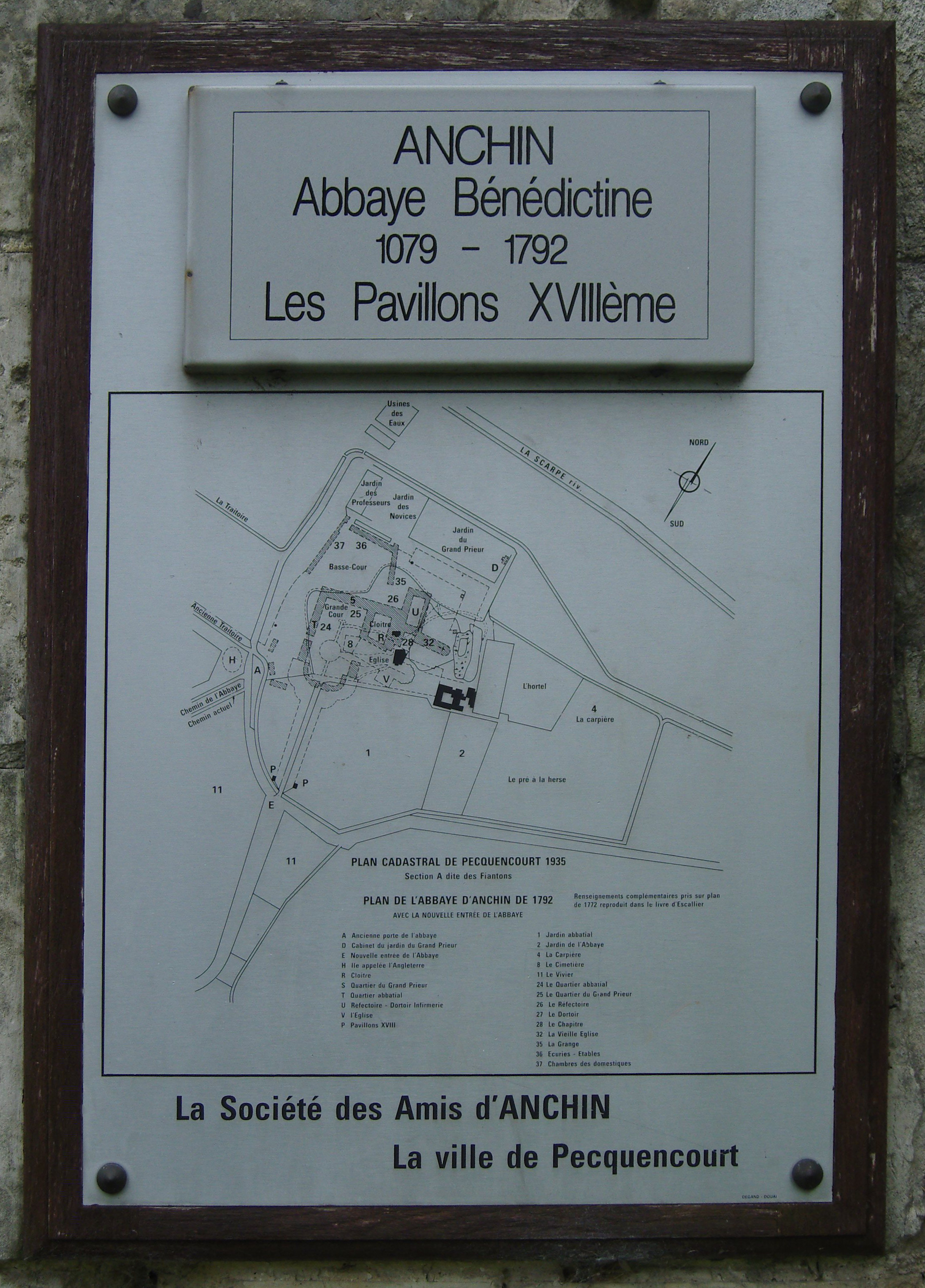
Map of the former abbey

=== The Church ===
The first church, under the name of Saint-Sauveur, was consecrated on October 7, 1086. Then in 1182, Baldwin V, Count of Hainaut, laid the foundation stone of the new church to be consecrated on October 23, 1250. Its dimensions were 105 meters long and 26 meters wide with a height of 26 meters, its four towers culminating at 56 meters.

After the Revolution, the Church tabernacle of the Anchin abbey is kept in the Hôpital-Général de Douai, and La Trinité, or Retable of Anchin. Polyptych on wood made by the Douanien artist Jehan Bellegambe around 1511 for the abbey, is preserved in Douai, in Musée de la Chartreuse de Douai.

The grand organ, with sixty stops and four manual keyboards, two of which are five octaves long, built in 1732 for the abbey by Cornil Cacheux and completed by Charles Dallery, with its buffet adorned with statues of David and Sainte Cécile carved in 1760 by Antoine Gili (1702–1781) after drawings of the monks, was transferred in 1792 to the Collégiale Saint-Pierre de Douai by Louis Péronard.

=== Conventional Buildings ===
==== The Library ====
Gossuin, beloved disciple of Bernard of Clairvaux, contemporary and conqueror of Abelard, was one of the most learned men of his time who instituted a school of manuscript illumination in his abbey. Some manuscripts escaped wars and revolutions form with those of the Marchiennes Abbey, a large part of the collection preserved in the Library of Douai.

== Treasures ==
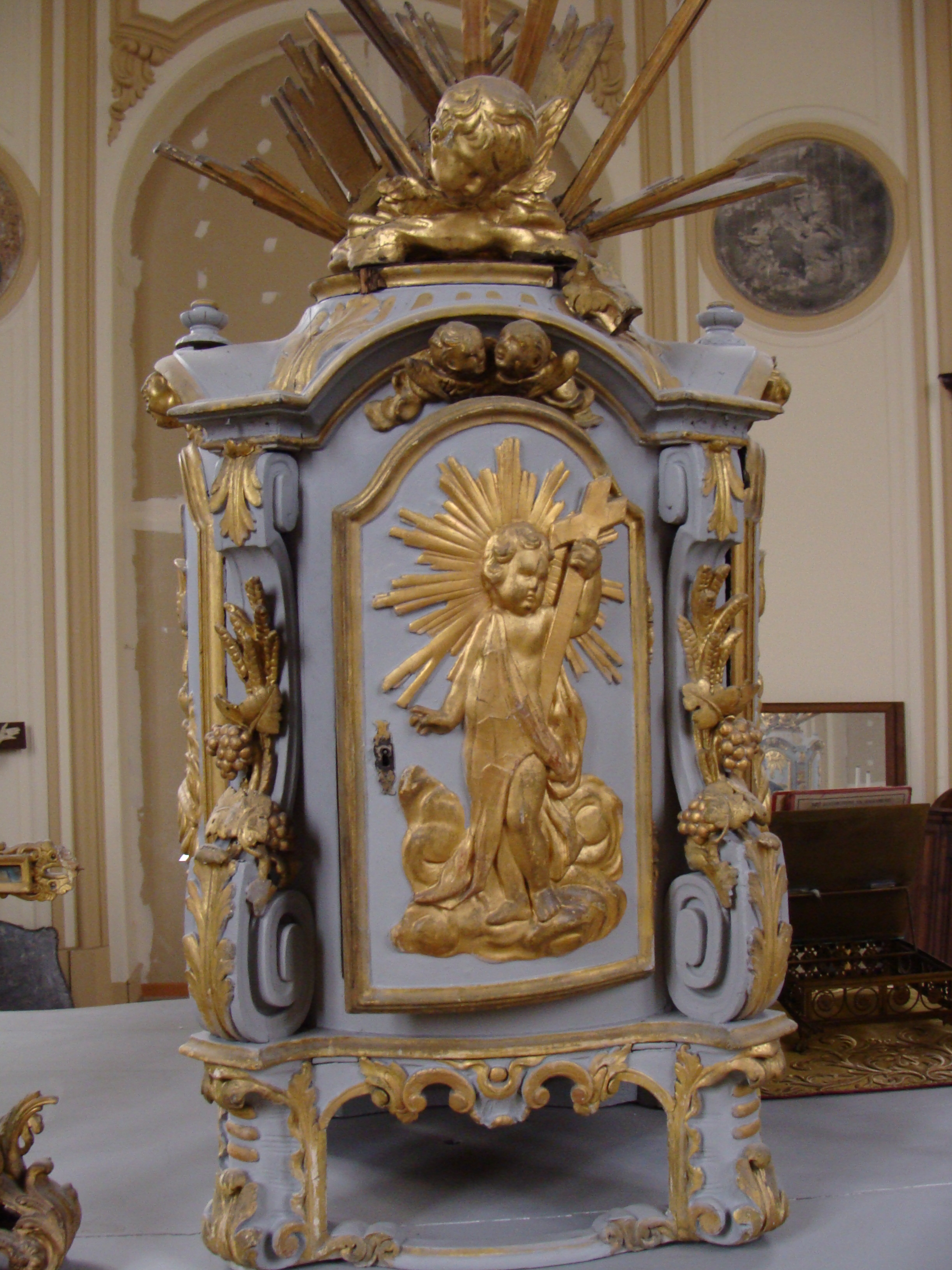
Tabernacle of Anchin Abbey, Douai General Hospital.

A 13th century gilded copper priest's cross, found at Anchin in 1872 in a tomb, is now in the musée des Beaux-Arts de Valenciennes. The Anchin Retable is a polyptych on wood of c.1551 by the artist Jehan Bellegambe, now held at the musée de la Chartreuse de Douai. A 12th-century manuscript containing hagiographies of St. Dunstan and Achard of St. Victor. The Lille painter Joseph Wamps also produced many works for the abbey, including many sketches destroyed by fire in the First World War.

== List of abbots ==
=== Regular abbots ===
1079-1087: Alard 1st abbot, reformist priest, he imposed the Rule of Saint Benedict, also adopted by the abbey of Affligem in 1085;

1088: Anselme, or Alelme, 2nd abbot, called from the Bec Abbey;

1088-1102: Haymeric, 3rd abbot, known as a simple monk of the Saint-Vaast Abbey, near Arras. Pope Urban II wrote to him several times. He attended the Council of Clermont of 1095 and the Synod of Arras in 1097;

1102-1110: Gelduin (died 1123), 4th abbot monk at the Abbey of Saint Vincent, Laon, appointed abbot of the Saint-Michel-en-Thiérache Abbey, he had refused the post and fled to Saint-Sauveur when the monks of this place elected him in their turn. He retired to the priory Saint-Magulphe, or Machut, in Wales, which belonged to the abbey where he died;

1110-1111: Robert (died in 1119), 5th abbot monk from the Abbey of Saint Bertin. Dissensions over his election obliged him to resign the following year;

1112-1130: Alvise (born about 1070, died in 1148 in Philippi in Macedonia), 6th abbot, then bishop of Arras, reformed monk of the Abbey of Saint Bertin, was prior at the abbey Saint-Vaast during his election. He obtained from Pope Pascal II and Pope Callixtus II, degrees granting to the abbots of Anchin almost episcopal rights, as well as numerous and extensive benefits;

1130-1165: St. Gossuin said Gozuinus, 7th Abbe;

1165-1175: Alexander, 8th abbot, biographer of his predecessor, elected the same day as that of the funeral of Abbot Gossuin;

1176: Simon, 9th Abbe;

Adam, 10th Abbe;

Guillaume, or Willaume Parent, 12th Abbe;

1243-1250: Jacques de Bethune, 14th abbot, received the habit from the hands of Father Simon;

1250: Guillaume Brunel, 15th Abbe;

Jean Battery, 24th or 30th Abbot;

Jean Lentailleur, 36th Abbot;

1577: Warnier of Daure, 37th abbot.

=== Commendatory abbots ===
1694: Cardinal César d'Estrées (1628-1714);

1789: Henry Benedict Stuart, Cardinal of York (1725-1807), 46th and last abbot, and 6th commendatory. He had modified the access to the monastery by the creation of two small pavilions which remain the only vestiges of the abbey.

== Gallery ==
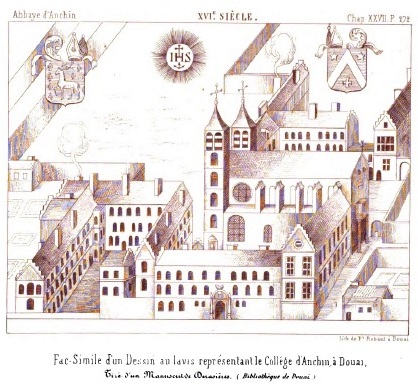
The Anchin college in Douai.

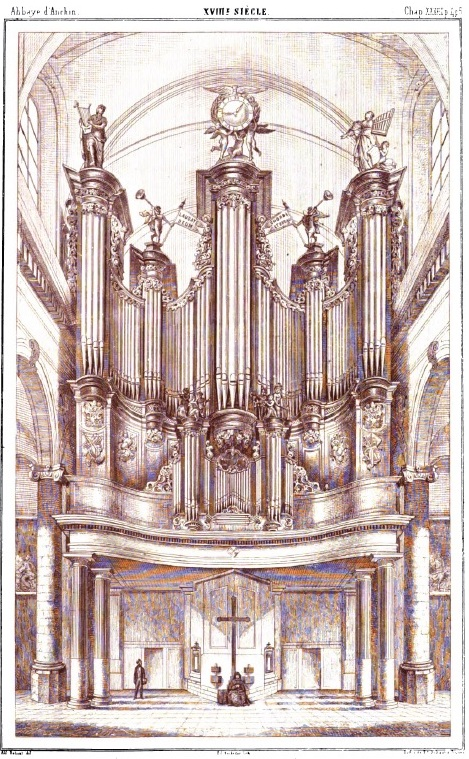
The organs of the Anchin abbey transferred to the collegiate church of Saint-Pierre de Douai.

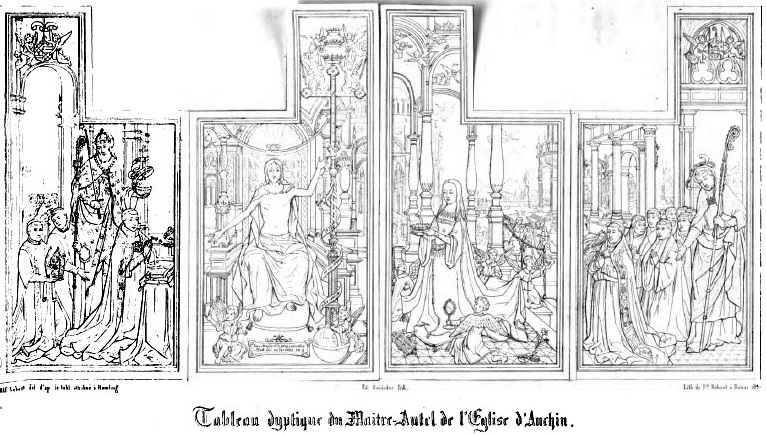
The diptych of the high altar.

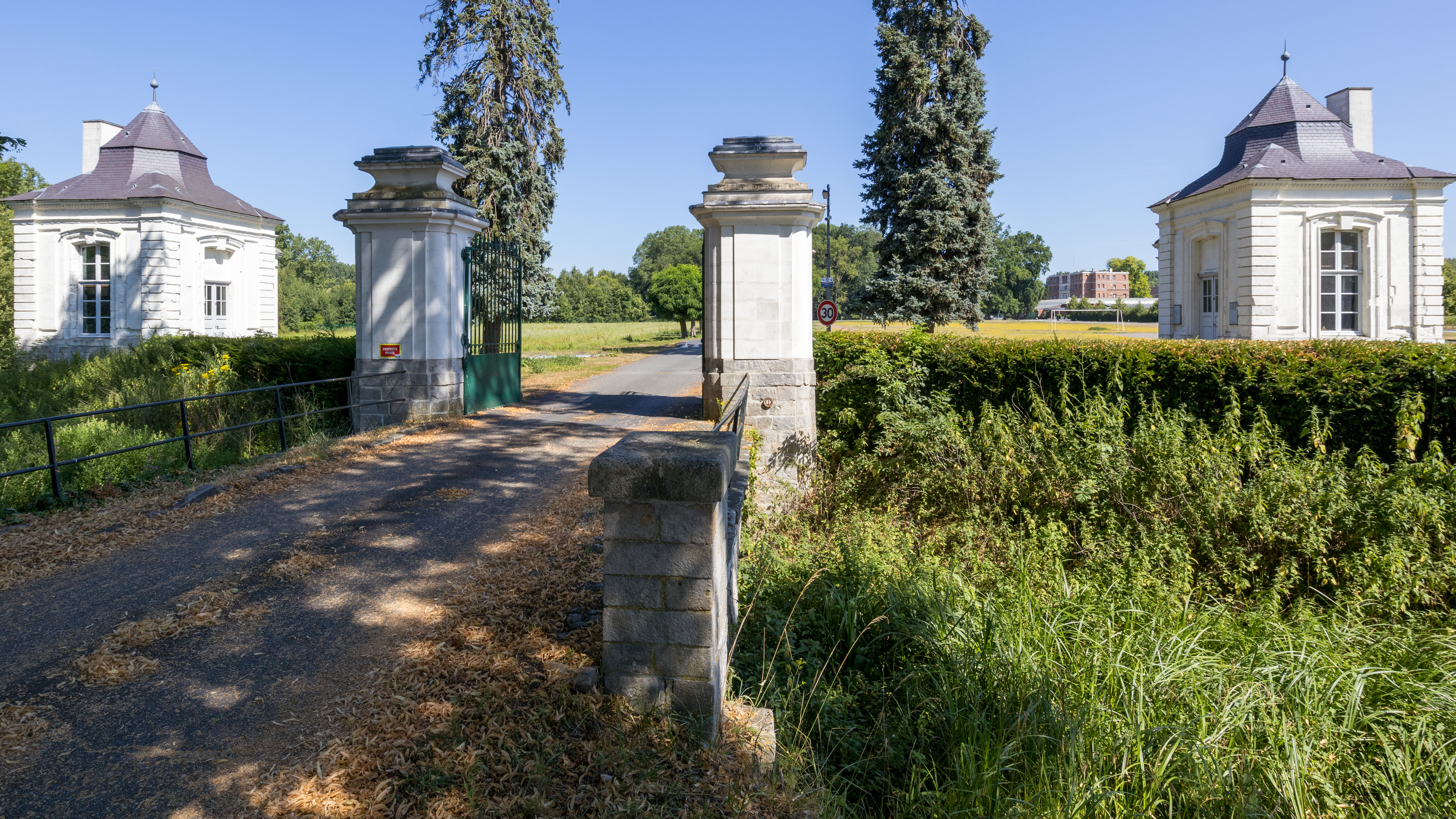
Entrance pavilions of the former Abbey of Anchin in Pecquencourt.

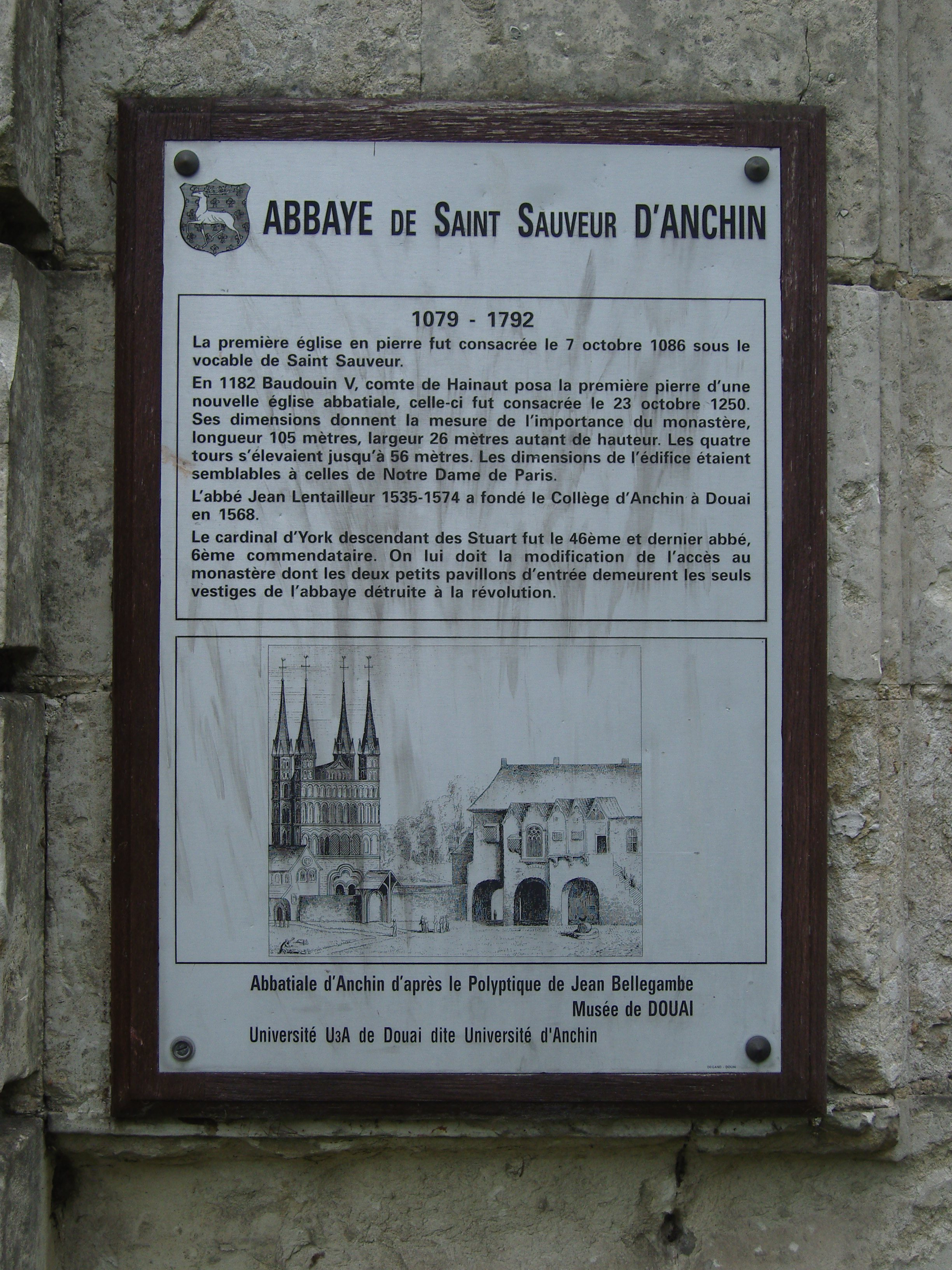
Detail of the abbey after the polyptych of Anchin by Jean Bellegambe.

Remains of the abbey in 2009.
