= François de Bar =

French monk and scholar

François de Bar (1538 – 25 March 1606) was a French Benedictine monk and scholar.

He was born at Seizencourt, near Saint-Quentin, and having studied at the University of Paris entered the Order of Saint Benedict. He soon became prior of Anchin Abbey, near Pecquencourt, and passed much of his time in the valuable monastery library, studying ecclesiastical history, especially that of Flanders. He also made a catalogue of the manuscripts at Anchin Abbey and annotated many of them. During the French Revolution his manuscripts passed to the library at Douai.

Bar died at Anchin on 25 March 1606.
