= Gelduin of Anchin =

Gelduin (died 1123) was a Benedictine monk who served as the third abbot of Anchin from 1102 to 1109.

Gelduin was the brother of the castellan of Hesdin. He became a monk at Saint-Vincent de Laon and then abbot of Saint-Michel en Thiérache. Around 1090, he resigned as abbot and retired to the Abbey of Anchin. In 1102, Abbot Haymeric died and the monks elected Gelduin to succeed him. Gelduin introduced the Cluniac reform into Anchin. In 1104 and 1105, he obtained bulls from Pope Paschal II confirming the monastery's spiritual and temporal jurisdiction, including over the priories of Aymeries (founded 1088) and Hesdin (1094). He wrote to Anselm of Canterbury concerning the right of his abbey to collect tithes. Anselm's cautious response survives.

In 1109, Gelduin retired a second time to live the speculative life in the Abbey of Saint-Bertin. A monk named Robert was elected to succeed him, but he was unable to keep the peace in the monastery and the monks re-elected Gelduin in 1111. Gelduin refused to accept his election and appealed to Bishop Lambert of Arras, who forced the monks to elect another. They chose Alvise, prior of Saint-Vaast d'Arras, as abbot. Gelduin then moved to England, where he died in 1123.

== Bibliography ==
- Constable, Giles (1964). Monastic Tithes from their Origins to the Twelfth Century. Cambridge University Press.
- Platelle, Henri (1984). "Gelduin". In R. Aubert (ed.). Dictionnaire d'histoire et de géographie ecclésiastiques. Vol. 20. Paris: Letouzey et Ané. cols. 310–311.
