= Goswin of Anchin =

12th-century Benedictine monk and Roman Catholic saint

Saint Goswin
- Born: 1086; Douai, County of Flanders
- Died: 9 October 1165 (aged 78–79); Pecquencourt, County of Flanders
- Venerated in: Roman Catholic Church
- Feast: 9 October

Goswin (French: Gossuin) was a Benedictine abbot. Born in Douai in 1086, then in the County of Flanders and since 1668 in France, he studied in Paris and afterwards returned to Douai to teach theology. Goswin then entered Anchin Abbey in 1113, in Pecquencourt, near his hometown, and became a Benedictine monk. In 1130 he was made abbot of Anchin Abbey.

Goswin died of natural causes in 1165 at Pecquencourt.
