= Alexandre Descatoire =

French sculptor (1874–1949)

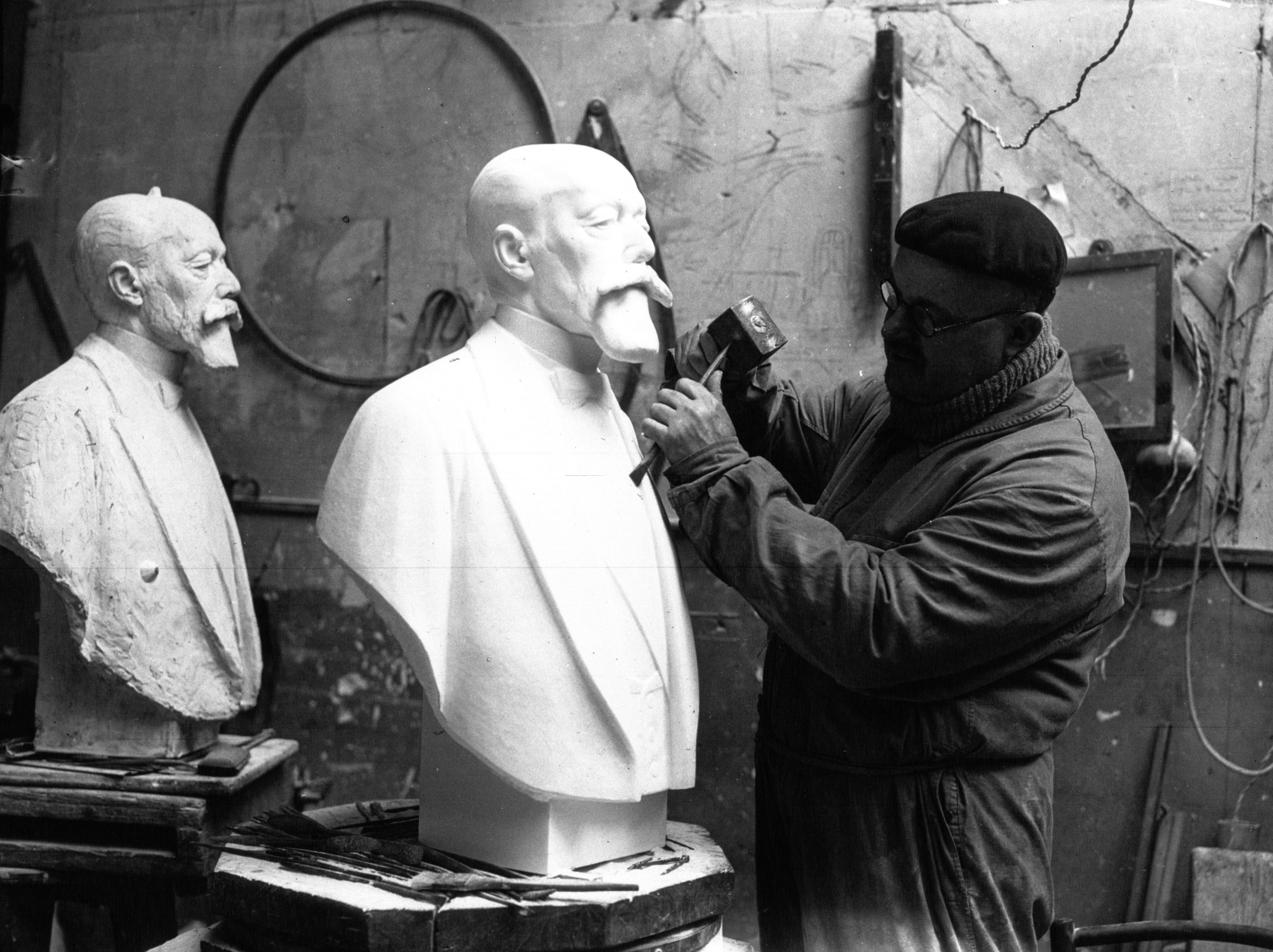
Descatoire finishing a bust of President Paul Doumer, 1932

Alexandre Descatoire (22 August 1874 – 7 March 1949) was a French sculptor.

== Biography ==
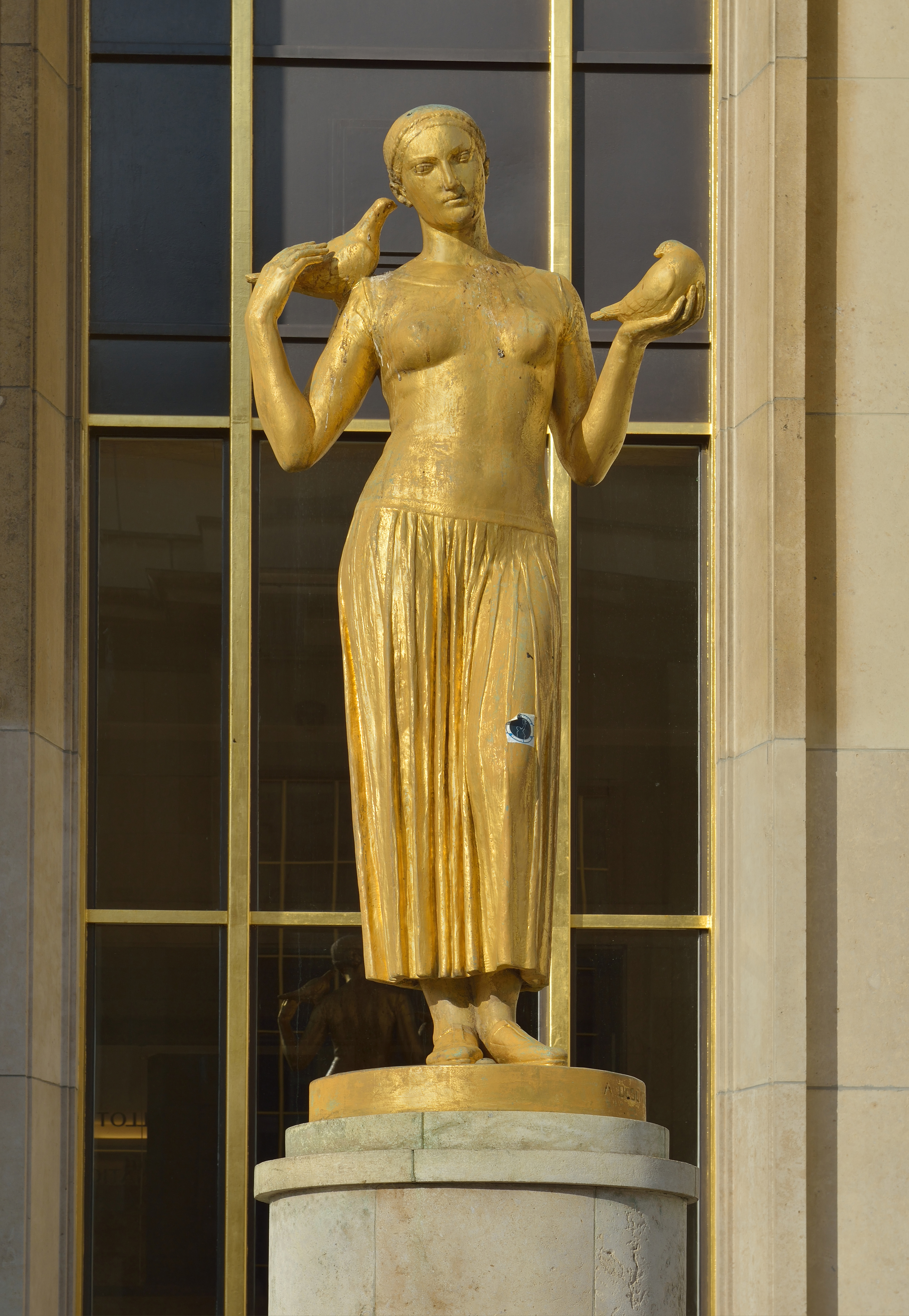
La Jeunesse

Descatoire was born in Douai and was a pupil of André-Louis-Adolphe Laoust. Educated at the École nationale supérieure des Beaux-Arts in Paris, Descatoire was runner up for the Prix de Rome of 1902.

Much of his work is war memorials. One of the best known is at Douai, inaugurated on 23 July 1927. A central bas-relief represents the Victory of the Lion of Flanders, flanked by a crossbowman and a machine gunner. The monument was damaged during bombing on 11 August 1944 but has been restored. The inclusion of a crossbowman refers back to another dramatic episode in Douaisian history, the Battle of Mons-en-Pévèle in 1324, when 600 citizens of Douai lost their lives.

Other works by Descatoire include:

- The work "Soldat Du Droit" at the Douaumont ossuary, circa 1932
- The monument to Mayor Gustave Dron in Tourcoing, with architect Édouard Monestès, 1935
- the monument Au Pigeon voyageur, dedicated to the work of carrier pigeons in World War I, with architect Jacques Alleman, Lille, 1936
- La Jeunesse, one of the eight gilded figures on the Palais de Chaillot, Paris, 1937
- The monument aux morts at Roubaix
- The monument aux morts at Créteil in the Val-de-Marne. This was inaugurated on 1 November 1922. The monument stands in the avenue du Maréchal de Lattre de Tassigny.
- The Death of Abel, now at the Musée de la Chartreuse de Douai
