= Bochart =

Bochart is a French surname. Notable people with the surname include:

- Matthieu Bochart (before 19 March 1619–1662), French Protestant minister at Alençon
- Samuel Bochart (1599–1667), French Protestant biblical scholar

== See also ==
- Bouchard, surname
- Bouchart, surname
