= Jehan Bellegambe =

French painter

Triptych of the Immaculate Conception

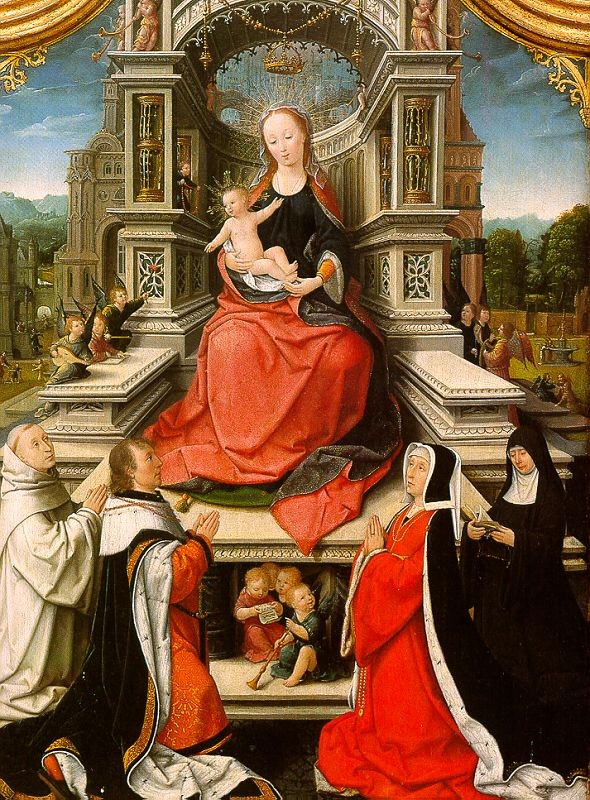
Triptych of Le Cellier

Jehan Bellegambe or Jean Bellegambe (sometimes Belgamb or Belganb) (c. 1470 – c. June 1535/March 1536) was a French-speaking Flemish painter of religious paintings, triptychs and polyptychs, the most important of which are now held at Douai, Arras, Aix, Lille, Saint Petersburg and Chicago. He was known as the 'master of colours' for the transparency and interplay of his colours. He is known as Jehan Bellegambe the elder to distinguish him from his descendants who were also called Jehan.

== Life ==
Bellegambe was born and died in Douai, then in the county of Flanders (today in French Flanders). He was a child of the first marriage of Georges Bellegambe, a cabinetmaker and musician who was living in rue Fosset-Maugart (renamed, in 1862, rue Haute-des ferronniers). Nothing is known of Jehan de Bellegambe's artistic training. The first known mention of him is a document of 1504 which names him as a master painter. In 1528 he owned a house at the corner of rue de la Cloris and rue du Palais.

The Martyrdom of Saint Agatha, Chartreuse Museum, Douai

== Works ==
His works are signed with a rebus.

- Triptych of the Lamentation of Christ (c. 1500), tempera and oil on panel, commissioned by Grégoire de Moscron and his wife Jossine, acquired in 1863 by the National Museum in Warsaw from the Johann Peter Weyer's collection.
- Triptych retable of Le Cellier (1508); showing the Cistercian abbey of Flines-lez-Raches, the porterie, the chevet and the transept.
- Retable of Saint Adrian of Nicomedia (1515), oil on oak panel, left panel 75 cm by 33.5 cm, acquired in 1856 by the Louvre. The saint is shown in three-quarter profile on foot, in armour and with a sword, standing on the city.
- Tripych of the mystic bath (1525), oil on wood, painted for Charles Coguin, 81 cm high, inscribed with the arms of the Abbaye d'Anchin, acquired in 1882 by the musée des Beaux-Arts de Lille, restored in 1921 and 1966.
- Polyptych of Anchin, formed of 9 panels, painted for the Abbaye d'Anchin. Five-year restoration by the musées de France at Versailles. Put back on display on 6 March 2007 at the Musée de la Chartreuse de Douai.
- Triptych of the Immaculate Conception (1525), Musée de la Chartreuse de Douai, commissioned by Jean Pottier (mayor of Douai from 1516) for his heavily sick daughter Marguerite. She wished to be buried in the chapel of the Walloon récollets of Douai and for her dowry to be used to pay for a retable dedicated to the Immaculate Conception. It was presented by the Pottier family.
- Saint Catherine of Alexandria and Saint Barbara (both 1520), Art Institute of Chicago, which acquired them in 1983 as part of the collection of George F. Harding.

== Notes and references ==
=== Bibliography ===
- (in French) A. Preux, Résurrection d'un grand artiste Jehan Bellegambe de Douai : peintre du retable d'Anchinin, Extrait des Souvenirs de la Flandre Wallone, livraison de juin 1862, éd. de V. Wartelle, 1862
- J. Turner, J., The dictionary of art. New York: Grove, 1996 ISBN 1-884446-00-0
