= Jean-Baptiste de Mornat =

Italian monk

Jean-Baptiste de Mornat (or Moronato) was an Italian monk born in the sixteenth century and died in 1632. He was chaplain advisor of King Henri IV and Marie de Medicis, abbot of the Saint-Michel-en-Thiérache Abbey.

From 1598 to 1628, he took up his residence in the abbey to rebuild and revive it.

He was buried in the Saint-Jean-Baptiste and Saint-Albert Chapel from the Couvent des Carmes Déchaussés in Paris.
