= Marinus van Reymerswaele =

16th-century Dutch painter

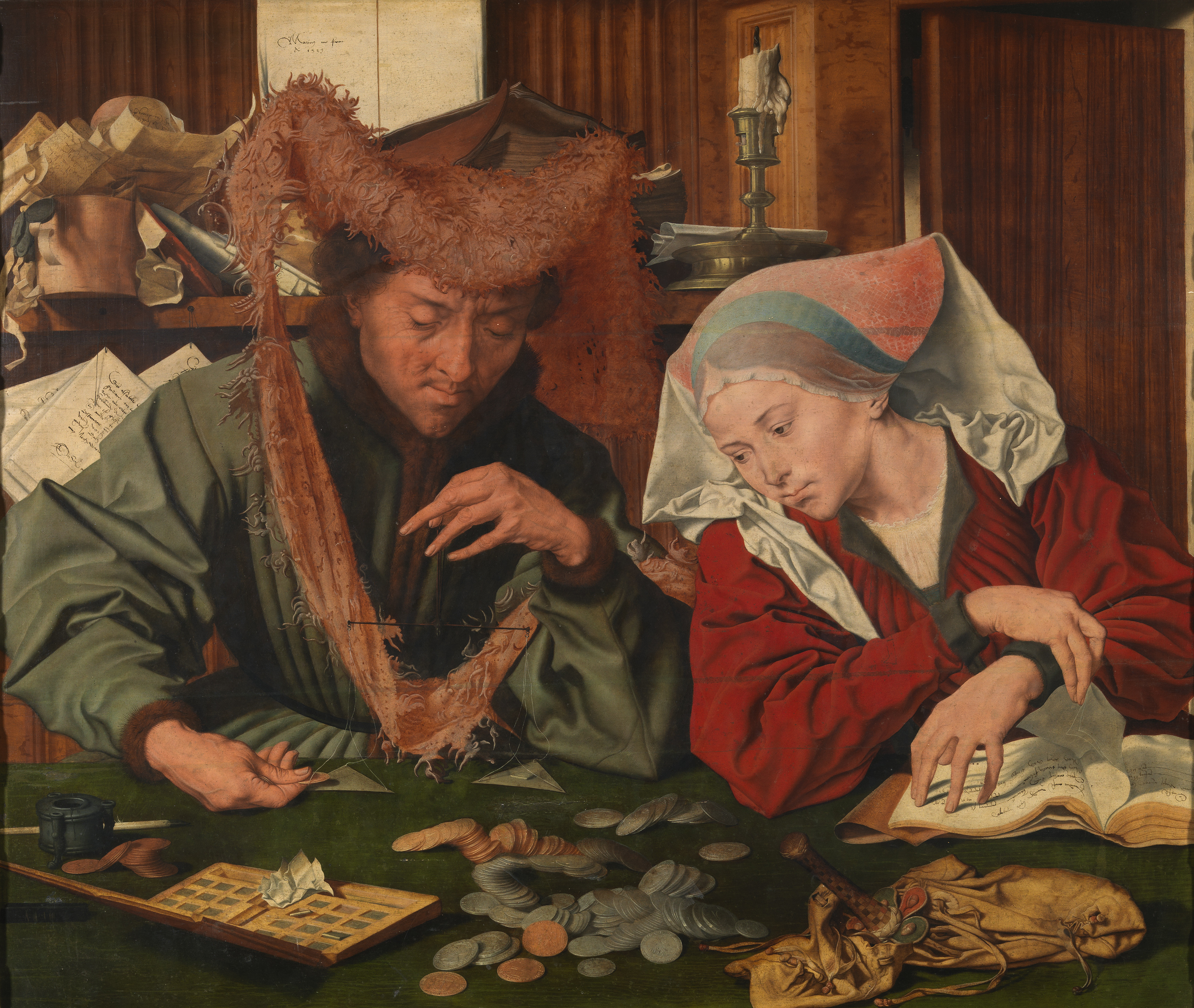
The moneychanger and his wife (1539), Museo del Prado, Madrid

Marinus van Reymerswaele or Marinus van Reymerswale (Note: Name variations: Marinus van Roymerswaele, Marinus Claesz. van Reymerswaele, Marinus Claesz. van Roymerswaele, Marino de Seeu, Marinus de Seeu, Marino de Seeuw, Marino de Siressea, Marino de Siressia, Marino de Sirissea, Marinus van Zeeuw) (c. 1490 – c. 1546) was a Dutch Renaissance painter mainly known for his genre scenes and religious compositions. After studying in Leuven and training and working as an artist in Antwerp, he returned later to work in his native Northern Netherlands. He operated a large workshop which produced many versions of mainly four themes: tax collectors, a money changer and his wife, a lawyer in his office, the calling of St. Matthew and St. Jerome in his study.

== Biography ==
Marinus van Reymerswaele was born in the city of Reimerswaal and he also derives his last name from this city. He was registered in February 1504 as a student at the University of Leuven. He was registered in 1509 in the Liggeren of the Antwerp Guild of Saint Luke as a pupil of Symon van Daele, a glass painter.

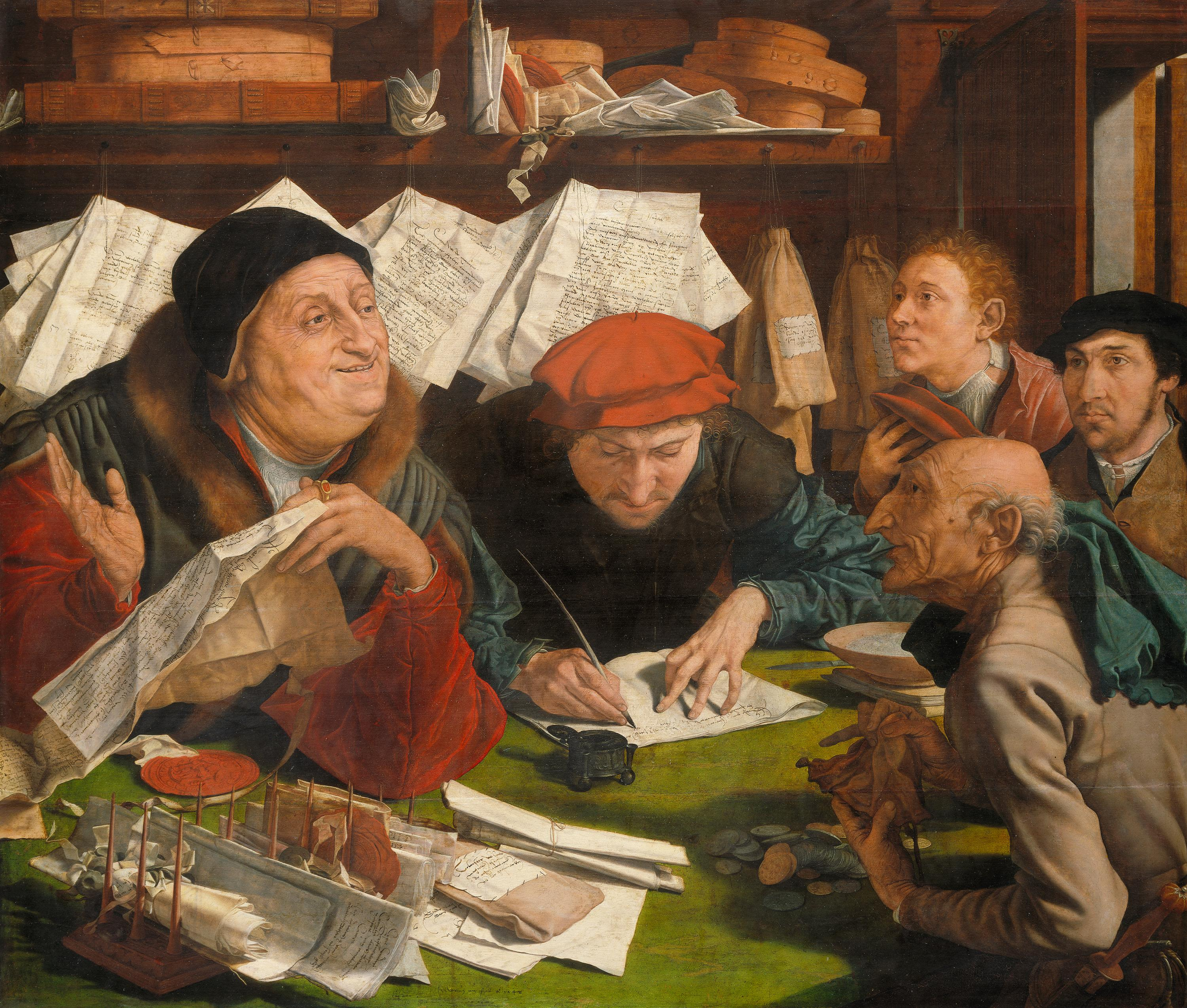
The Tax Collector (1542), Alte Pinakothek, Munich

He worked, at least from 1531 to 1540 in Antwerp. In the latter year he moved to Goes, where he died around 1546.

== Work ==
The artist is known for a small number of signed panels. A number of other paintings are attributed to him on stylistic grounds. His works show the influence of the Antwerp painter Quentin Matsys.

He painted a limited numbers of themes, mostly adapted from Quentin Massys and Albrecht Dürer:

- The moneychanger and his wife
- Two tax collectors
- A lawyer in his office
- Saint Jerome in his study
- The calling of Matthew

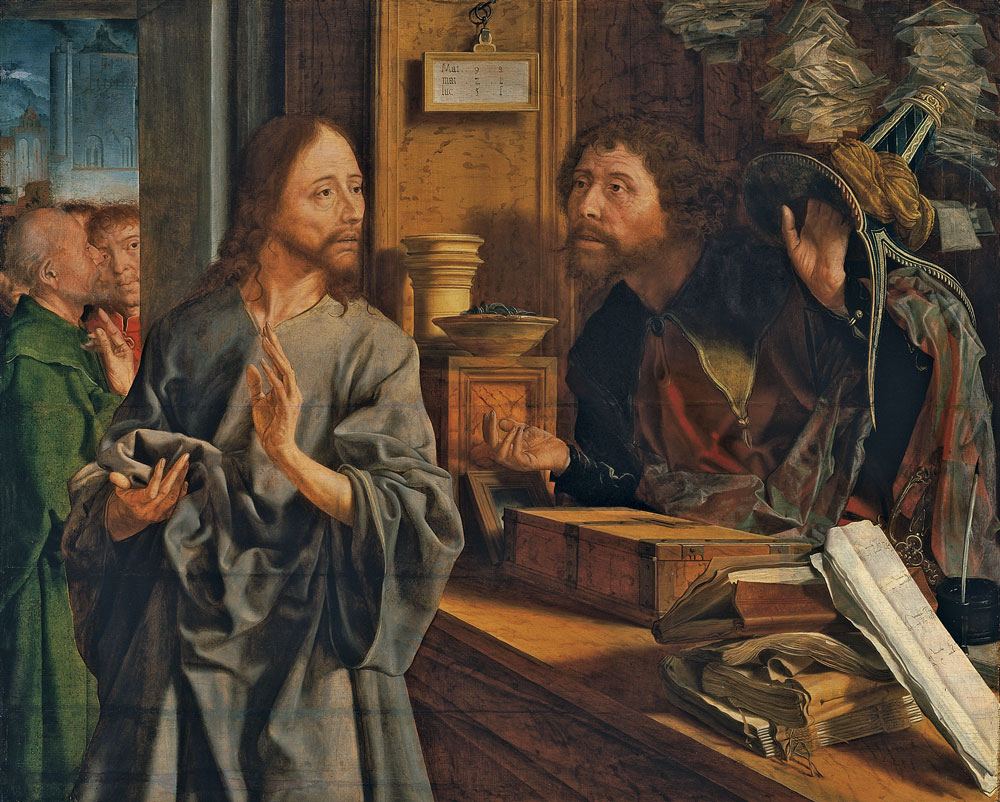
The Calling of St. Matthew (1530s), Thyssen-Bornemisza Museum, Madrid

A large group of paintings of tax collectors are wrongly attributed to van Reymerswaele. His themes were popular in the sixteenth century and many works were made after his paintings.

== List of works ==
- Antwerp, The Phoebus Foundation
  - Two tax collectors
- Antwerp, Royal Museum of Fine Arts
  - Saint Jerome in his study (1541)
  - Two tax collectors
- Douai, Musee de la Chartreuse
  - Saint Jerome in his study
- Dresden, Gemäldegalerie Alte Meister
  - The moneychanger and his wife (1541)
- Florence, Bargello
  - The moneychanger and his wife (1540)
- Ghent, Museum voor Schone Kunsten
  - The Calling of Matthew
- Copenhagen, Statens Museum for Kunst
  - The moneychanger and his wife (1540)
- London, National Gallery
  - Two tax collectors (c. 1540) attributed to the workshop by the Museum.
- Maastricht, Bonnefanten Museum
  - Saint Jerome in his study (c. 1541)
- Madrid, Museo del Prado
  - Saint Jerome (1521)
  - The Virgin nursing the Child (1525–1550)
  - The moneychanger and his wife (1538) displayed permanently at the Royal Palace of La Granja de San Ildefonso (Segovia)
  - The moneychanger and his wife (1539)
  - Saint Jerome in his study (1541)
- Madrid, Real Academia de Bellas Artes de San Fernando
  - St. Jerome in his cell (1535)
- Madrid, Museo Thyssen-Bornemisza
  - The Calling of St. Matthew (c. 1530)
- Munich, Alte Pinakothek
  - A lawyer (1542)
  - The moneychanger and his wife (1538)
- Naples, Palace of Capodimonte
  - Two tax collectors
- New Orleans, New Orleans Museum of Art
  - The lawyer's office (1543)
- Paris, Louvre
  - Two tax collectors (c. 1540)
- Saint Petersburg, Hermitage
  - Two tax collectors
- Vienna, Kunsthistorisches Museum
  - Saint Jerome in his study
  - The Unjust Steward

== Gallery ==
Selected works

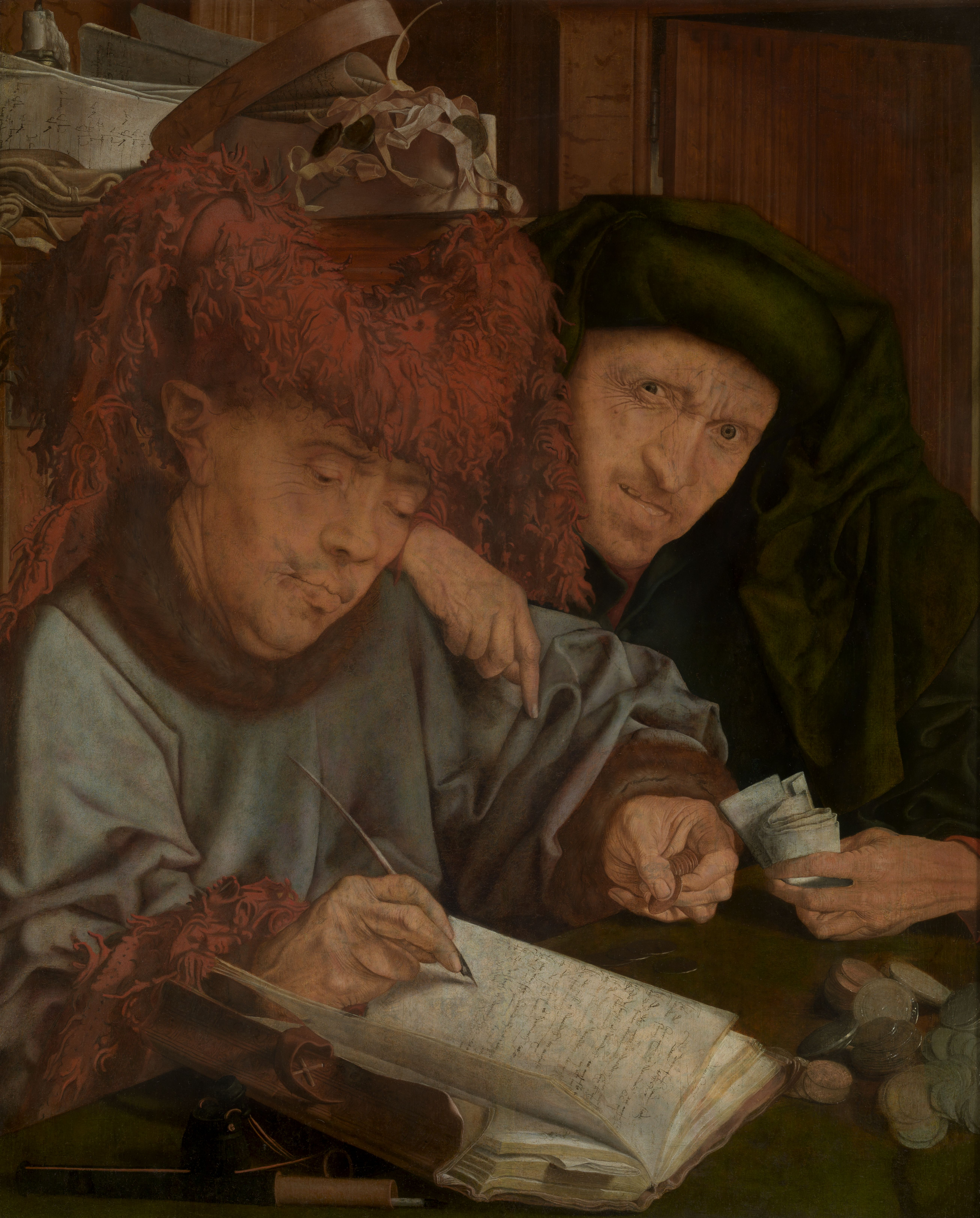
The tax collectors (c. 1530–1535), Royal Museum of Fine Arts Antwerp

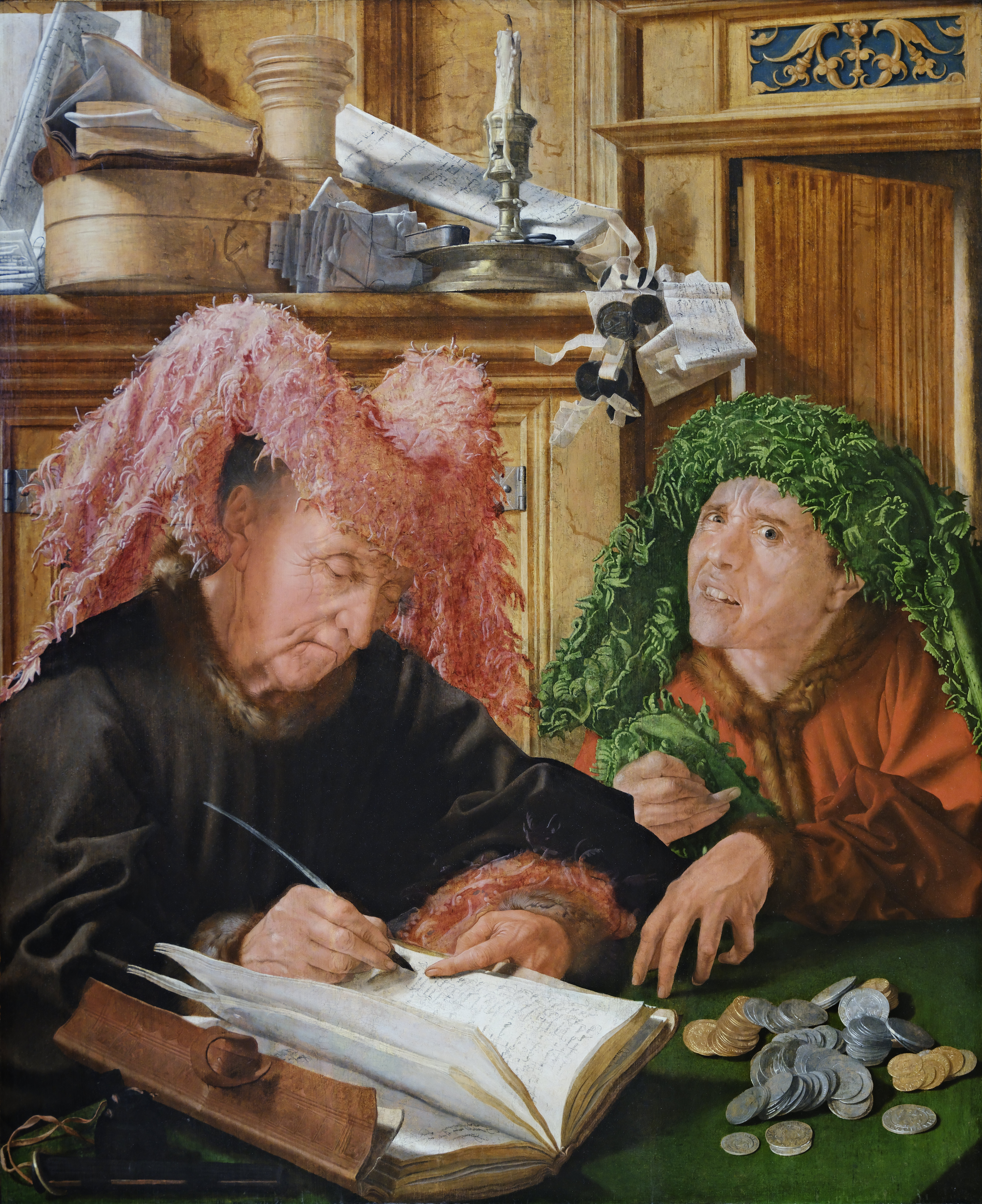
Two tax collectors (c. 1540), Louvre, Paris

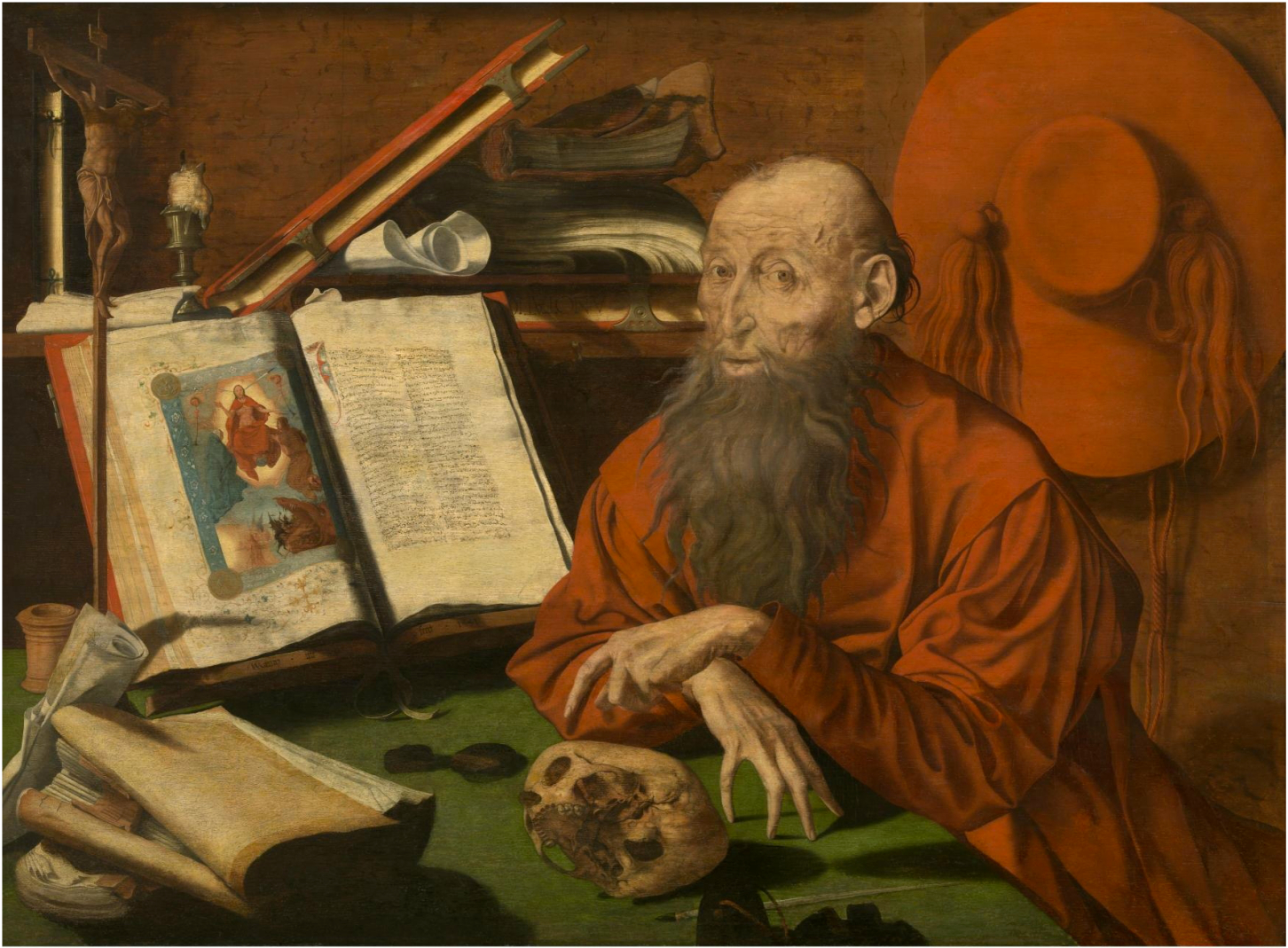
Saint Jerome in his study (1541), Royal Museum of Fine Arts Antwerp
