= Musée de la Chartreuse de Douai =

Museum in Douai, France

Coordinates: 50°22′29″N 3°4′32″E

The Musée de la Chartreuse

The Musée de la Chartreuse is an art museum in a former Carthusian monastery in Douai, France. It is the 'musée des Beaux-Arts' for the city.

== Building ==
Interieur of the museum

Built by Jacques d'Abancourt in brick and stone in the Renaissance style, on the site of the house of the "Colombier", the hôtel d'Abancourt (1559) with its round tower was extended in 1608 by Jean de Montmorency, who added a square building in the same style with a square tower. In 1623 it was acquired by the Premonstratensians of Furnes. It finally saw itself become a home for Carthusian monks in the middle of the 17th century, via the construction of a chapter house and a small cloister (1663), a refectory (1687), the prior's lodgings (1690) and finally - after a large cloister and cells which were demolished in the 19th century - a chapel in the Jesuit style (not restored yet). On the French Revolution the building was turned over to military use and it was later damaged by bombing in 1944. It was bought by the city in 1951 and from 1958 was used to replace the buildings housing the city's musée des Beaux-Arts, which had been destroyed in the Second World War at the same time as the neighbouring boys' lycée.

Exhibition of statues in the chapel.

The current museum complex includes several 16th, 17th and 18th century buildings. To its left is the hôtel d'Abancourt-Montmorency, built between 1559 and 1608 in the Flemish Renaissance style. Built in the classical style at the start of the 18th century, the complex's church is made up of a vast nave and five side chapels. After a six-year restoration campaign, this church was used to display objets d'art and sculptures to the public, with the 19th century sculptures in the nave and objets d'art in the side chapels, including medieval goldwork and a series of bronzes and terracottas by Giambologna, who was born in Douai.

The ancient convent is listed as a Monument historique since 1930 by the French Ministry of Culture.

== Donors ==
- 1852 - Théophile Bra gave the works in his studio
- 1857 - Doctor Escalier gave his collection of 176 Flemish and Dutch paintings
- 1877 - Foucques de Wagnonville bequeathed the museum his collection, including several statues by Giambologna
- Unknown date - Jean-Baptiste Fortier left the museum a sum of money allowing the purchase of works by Veronese, Rubens and Gustave Courbet

== Curators ==
- Jacques Guillouet
- Anne Labourdette since 2007

== Permanent collections ==
Over 100 works are on show, chronologically retracing the evolution of European painting from the Middle Ages to modern art.

=== Works on show ===
- The Venetian Woman and Portrait of a Lady (1565) by Paul Veronese (1528–1588)
- The Flagellation by Carracci
- The Virgin, Protectress of the Cistercians by Jehan Bellegambe, oil on wood (16th century)
- Le Four des Maures by Henri-Edmond Cross, oil on canvas (1906)
- The rose garden in Monaco by Henri-Edmond Cross, oil on canvas (1884)
- The Friends of Fontvieille by Félix Labisse, oil on canvas (1945)
- Instituto de arte moderno Paraguay 665 by Félix Labisse, canvas poster
- The death of Abel by Alexandre Descatoire, sculpture
- The Marchiennes Polyptych by Jan van Scorel (16th century), produced for the Abbaye de Marchiennes.
- The Anchin Polyptych by Jehan Bellegambe

=== Gallery ===
Immaculate Conception (The Church Fathers and the Donors) by Jean Bellegambe, 1526

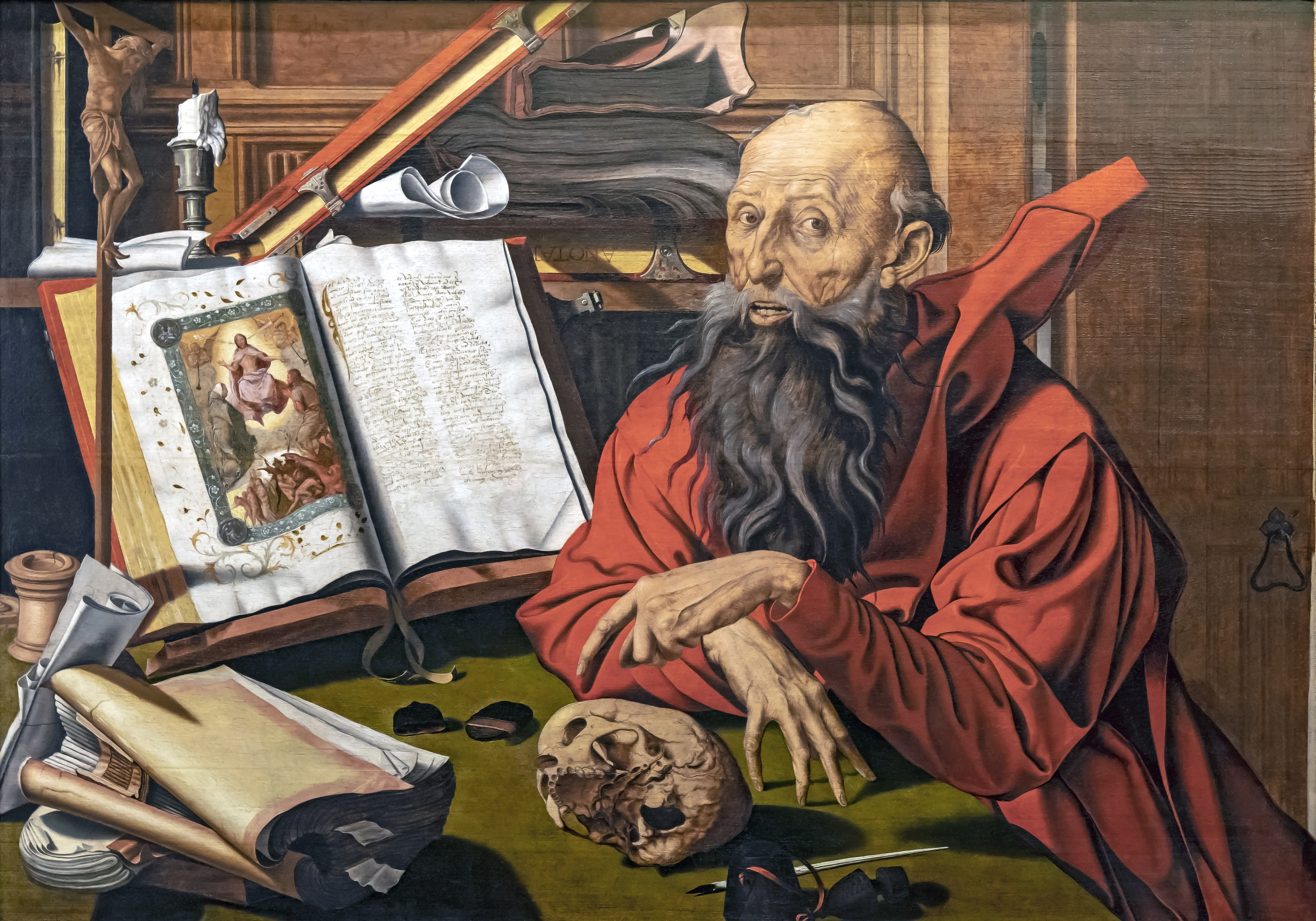
St Jerome in his study 1540 - Marinus van Reymerswaele

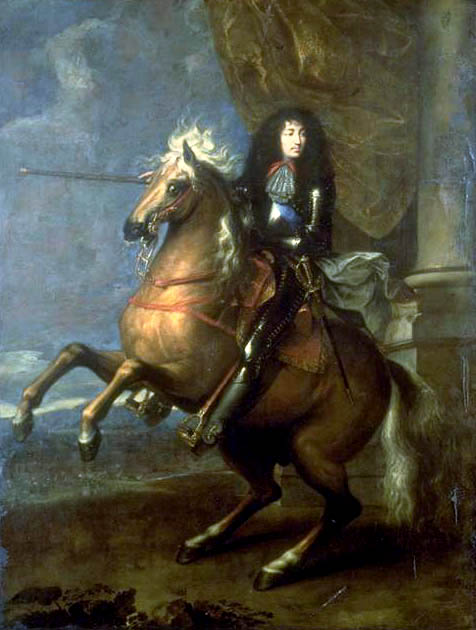
Louis XIV, oil, Charles Le Brun, 1668

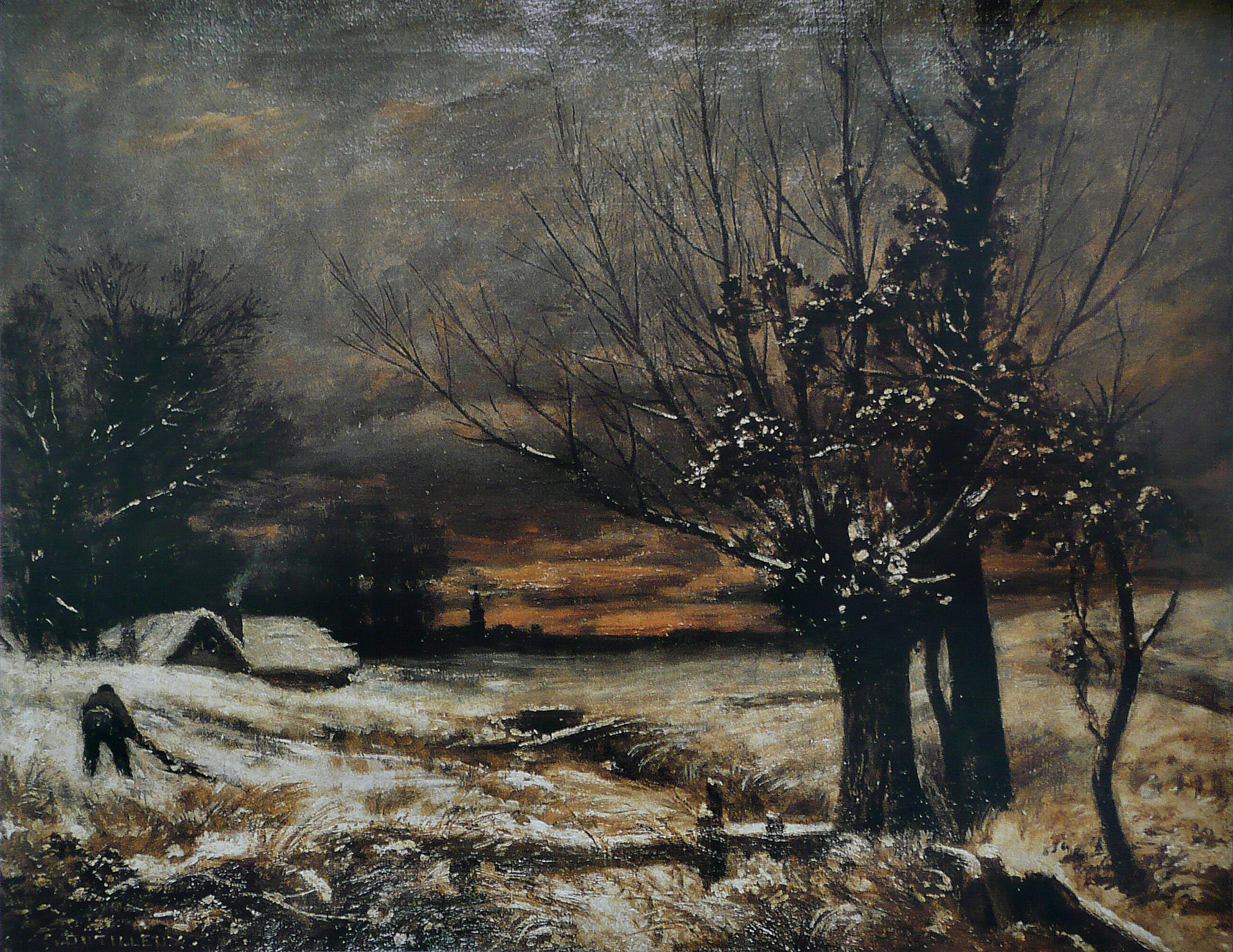
Snow effect, Constant Dutilleux, 1865

*La Sente du Chou, near Pontoise* by Camille Pissarro, 1878

Portrait of Madame Cross by Henri-Edmond Cross, 1901

The Place d'Armes in Douai under the snow by Henri Duhem, Musée de la Chartreuse de Douai, 1910

Study for a portrait of Auguste Renoir, Musée de la Chartreuse de Douai, c. 1910

Jean Bellegambe by Édouard Houssin, 1896

The Lifeboat by Édouard Houssin, 1901

== Temporary exhibitions ==
The museum also organises temporary exhibitions, such as Douai, d'un siècle à l'autre (1999, presenting the plan for the reconstruction of Douai drawn up by the architects Alexandre Miniac and Petit, on the initiative of the Secretary of State for Reconstruction). Others include:

- Au cirque, le peintre et le saltimbanque, shown at the Musée de la Chartreuse de Douai 9 April-18 July 2004. Commissariat Général : Françoise Baligand & Zéev Gourarier.

Catalogue : Au cirque, le peintre et le saltimbanque, collectif, Musée de la Chartreuse, Douai - Somogy Éditions d'Art, Paris (2004). ISBN 2-85056-736-1.
