= Joseph Wamps =

French painter (1689–1744)

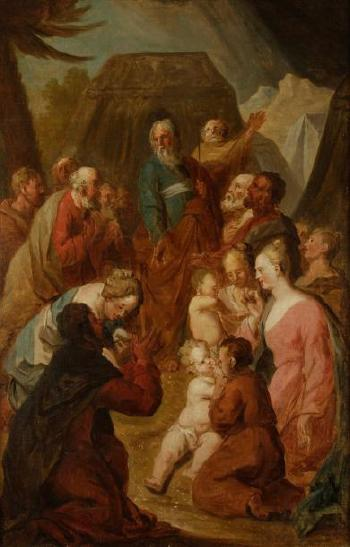
Harvesting the Manna

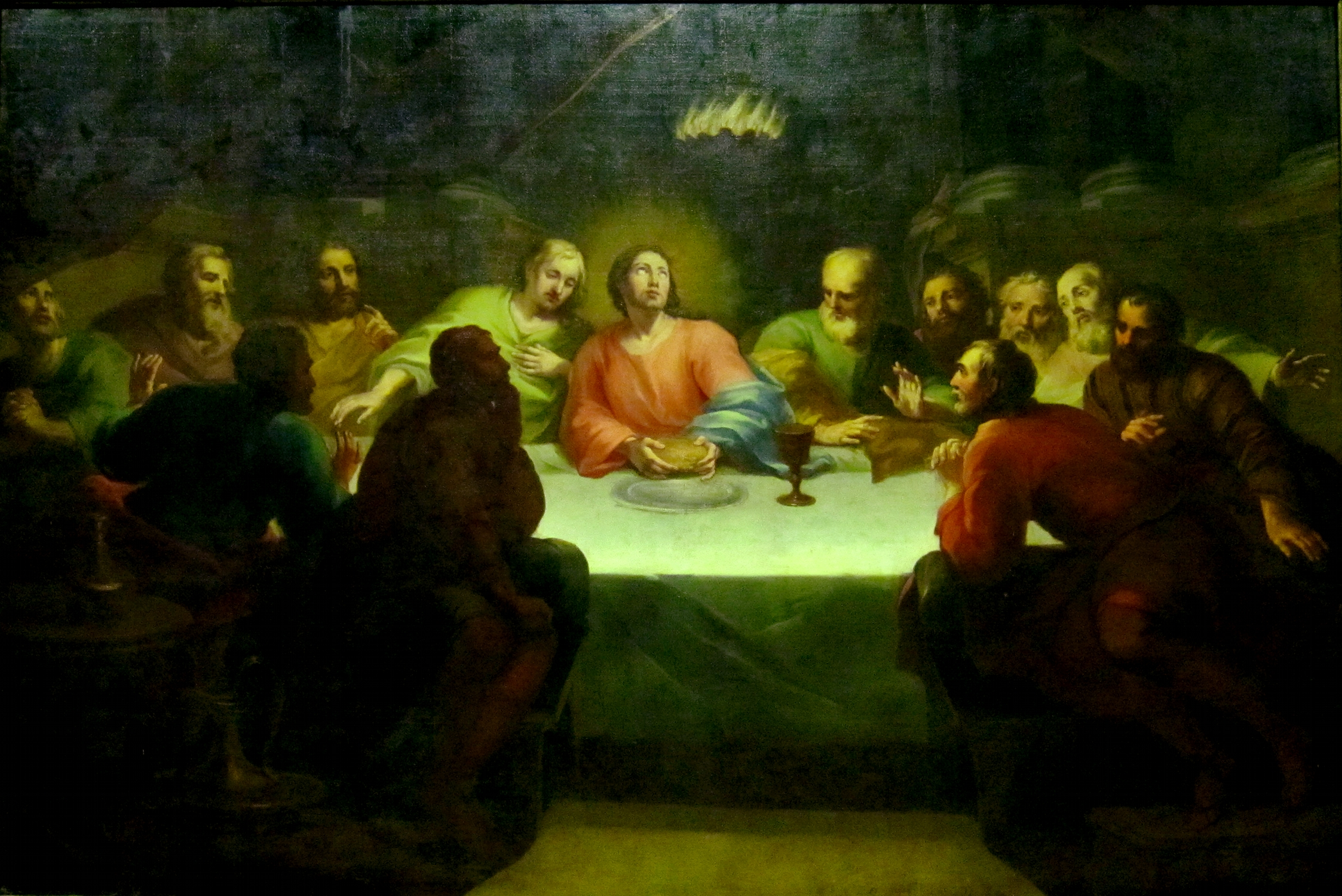
The Last Supper

Bernard-Joseph Wamps (30 November 1689 – 9 August 1744) was a French painter; mostly of religious subjects.

== Biography ==
He was born in Lille, French Flanders. His father was listed in the "Registre aux Bourgeois" and he received his first lessons in his hometown from Arnould de Vuez. Later, he studied porcelain painting at the local manufactory and went to Paris, where he worked in the studios of Pierre-Jacques Cazes. Around 1706, he painted his first major work: "Saint John Preaching in the Wilderness", commissioned by the Lancry family.

In 1715, he was awarded the Prix de Rome of the Académie royale de peinture et de sculpture with his rendering of Judith beheading Holofernes, and received a pension to study at the French Academy in Rome, where he spent five years.

After returning in 1720, he received numerous commissions from religious institutions and created decorations for the Governor's residence. He worked throughout the area, painting murals and other works at churches and convents in Douai, Cambrai, Arras, Tournai, Ghent and Valenciennes. Eventually, he acquired enough money to purchase the home of his former teacher, Vuez.

The loom-worker Guillaume Werniers produced a series of tapestries on the life of Christ, after drawings by Wamps. These were installed in the choir room of the "Église Saint-Sauveur". Most were later moved to museums, but one went to the "Église Saint Pierre d'Antioche" in Villeneuve-d'Ascq.

His paintings for Anchin Abbey were destroyed during World War II and are now preserved only as sketches. Other major works include "The Dream of Saint Joseph" and "The Resurrection of Christ" at the Hospice Comtesse and "The Judgment of David" at the Palais des beaux-arts de Lille.

Wamps died in Lille in 1744.
