= Bouchart =

Bouchart is a French surname. Notable people with the surname include:

- Armand Bouchart (fl. 1190s), Knight Templar
- Natacha Bouchart (born 1963), French politician

== See also ==
- Bochart, surname
- Bouchard, surname
