= André-Louis-Adolphe Laoust =

French sculptor

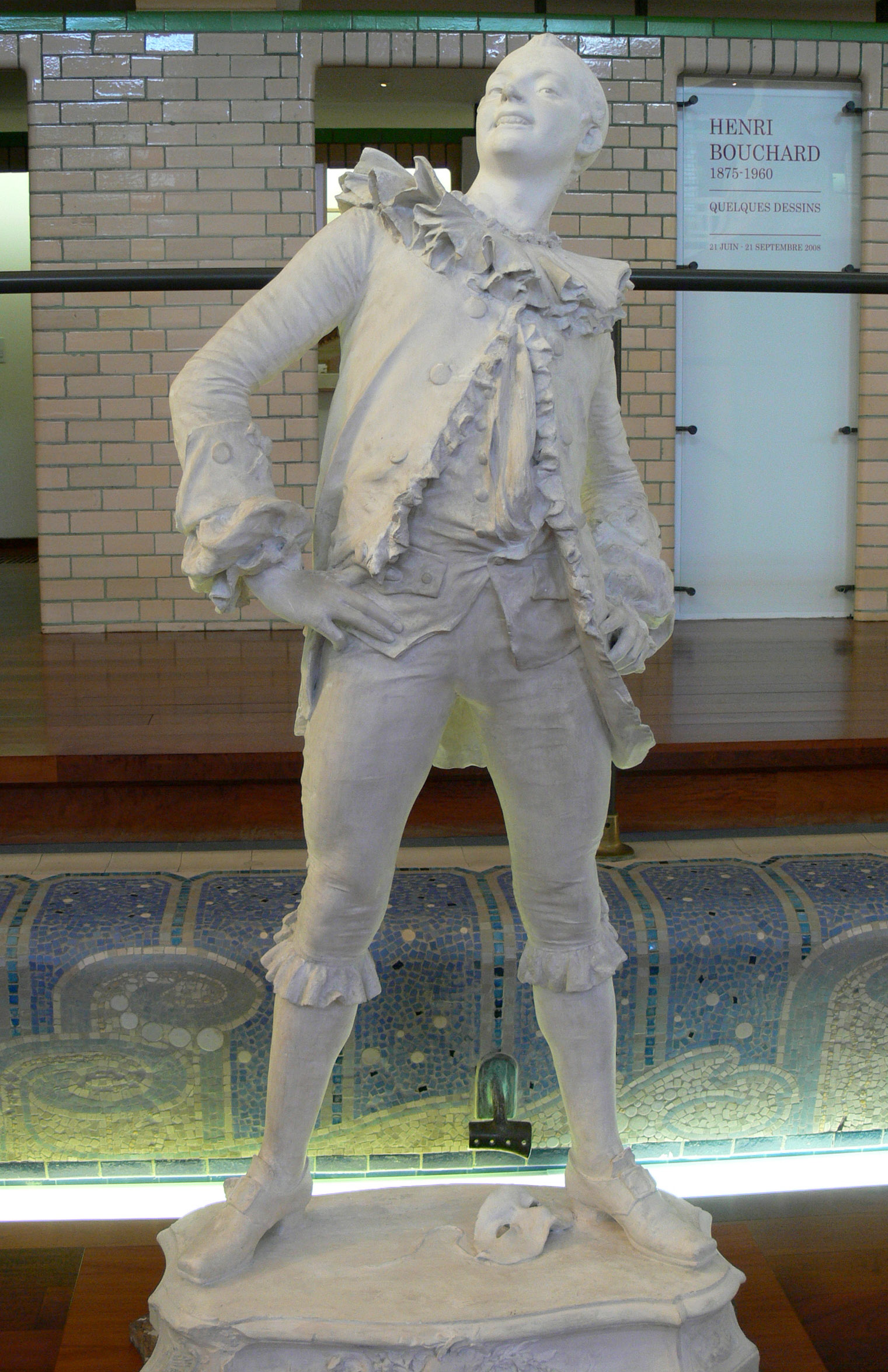
Pierrot (1889), plaster model for a marble work, gift by the sculptor in 5000, inventory number: 2999-874-22

André-Louis-Adolphe Laoust or André Laoust (1843–1924) was a French sculptor born in Douai. He exhibited in the Salon of 1882.

== See also ==
- Academic painting
