= Nicole Aubrey =

French exorcism subject

Nicole Aubrey or Obry (circa 1550 – fl. 1565) was a young married French woman, 15 or 16 years of age, who was publicly exorcised in 1566 in the French city of Laon. Occurring during the French Wars of Religion, the so-called Miracle of Laon was almost immediately seized upon for polemic by proponents of the Counter-Reformation, and it is from those polemics that the account survives.

== Events leading up to the exorcism ==
In the aftermath of the Edict of Amboise, tensions between Catholics and Huguenots remained high in France, including in the city of Laon, which lay in the domain of the Prince of Conde, a Protestant.

In November 1565, Nicole Obry, a resident of Vervins, became so sick she was unable to eat, and claimed to be possessed by an evil spirit that she thought was the ghost of her deceased grandfather. Her family obtained the services of a Dominican priest, Pierre de la Motte, who attempted to exorcise the young woman. He rid her of a number of demons, who promptly "fled to Geneva", the center of the Calvinist movement. The chief demon, however, who identified himself as "Beelzebub, the Prince of the Huguenots", refused to leave for any personage less than the Bishop of Laon.

On 4 January 1566 Bishop Jean de Bours arrived in Vervins but was unable to exorcise the demon. On 29 January the Bishop led a procession to the cathedral of Laon, where the demon engaged in a theological discourse with the Bishop, alleging that the Huguenots were cruel and infidel, that they stole the communion wafer, cut it up, boiled it, and burned the pieces. According to "Beelzebub", the Huguenots would do more evil to Jesus Christ than the Jews had done. After daily processions to the cathedral, on 8 February, the "miracle of Laon" occurred when the bishop held up the Holy Eucharist, and drove the remaining demons from Obry's body.

== Effect on the Wars of Religion ==
Within months of the event, multiple eyewitness accounts had been published and spread throughout Europe. For Catholics, the exorcism was a miracle and proof of the real presence of Christ in the Eucharist: a refutation of Protestant heresy. For Protestants, the event was believed to be a hoax, and Louis, the Prince of Conde imprisoned Obry until he was ordered to free her by Charles IX.

Louis, believing that persecution of Protestants was imminent, attempted to overthrow Charles, and war broke out again.

== Sources ==
- Backus, Irena Dorota, Guillaume Postel et Jean Boulaese: De Summopere (1566) et Le Miracle De Laon (1566) (Droz 1995).
- Kuntz, Marion, Guillaume Postel: Prophet of the Restitution of All Things, His Life and Thought (Martinus Nijhoff 1981).
- Pearl, Jonathan L., The Crime of Crimes. Demonology and politics in France 1560-1620 (Waterloo 1999) 43-45.
