= Alexandre Miniac =

French painter

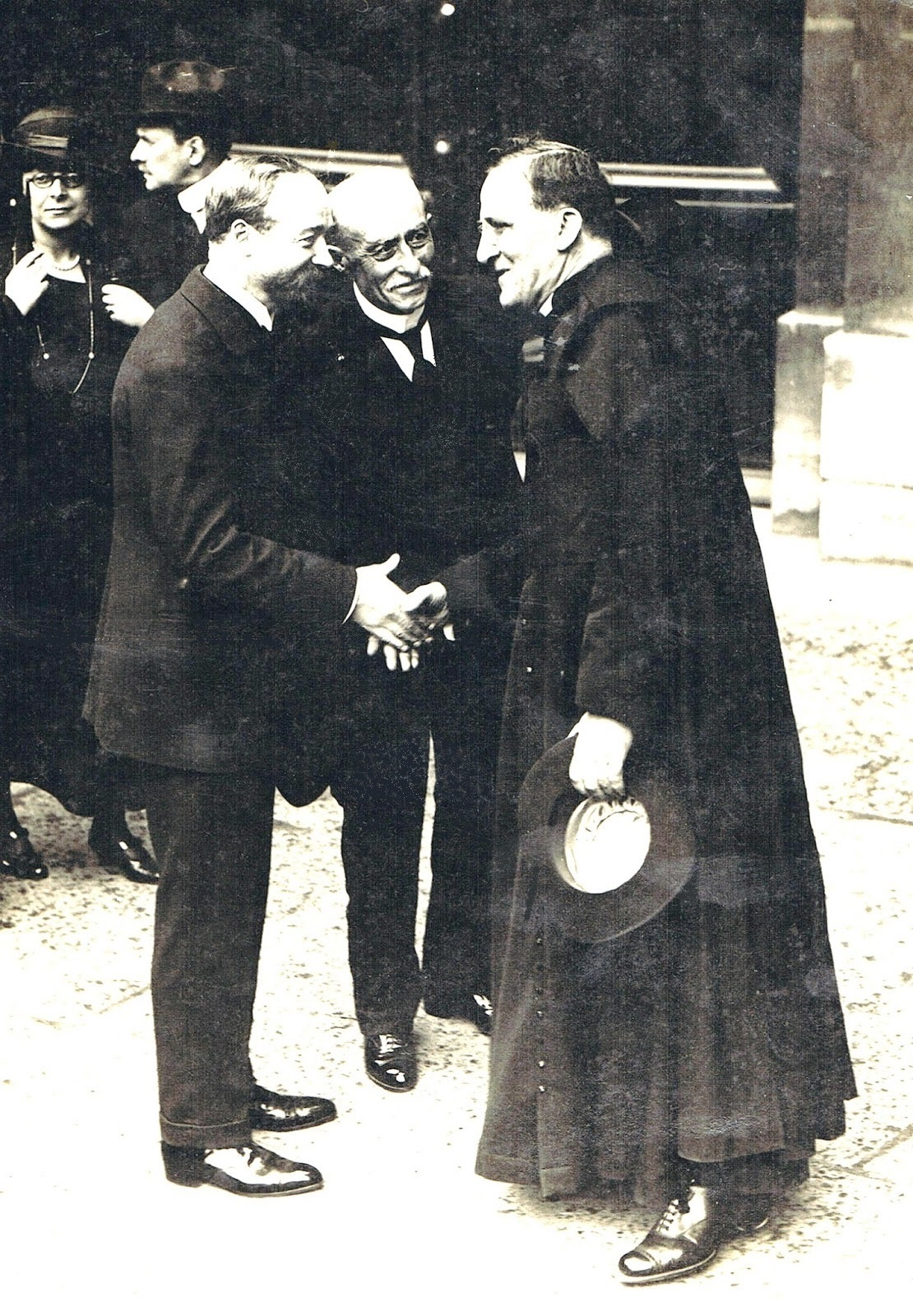
- Alexandre Miniac (Left) shakes hands with Henri Brémond(right)
- Born: July 5, 1885; Saint-Servan, France
- Died: December 3, 1963 (aged 78); Paris, France
- Citizenship: French
- Occupation: Architect
- Buildings: 11-13, Petites-Écuries street, in Paris (10e), France. Town hall of Albert (Somme), France.
- Projects: Amiens's hospital center

Alexandre Miniac (5 July 1885 – 3 December 1963) was a French architect and watercolorist. Son of Paul Miniac (1851-1936), fabric merchant, and Marie Desmonts (1854-1934), Alexandre Miniac was the great-nephew of the French academician Louis Duchesne. His brother was Edmond Miniac, attorney general at the court of cassation in Paris.

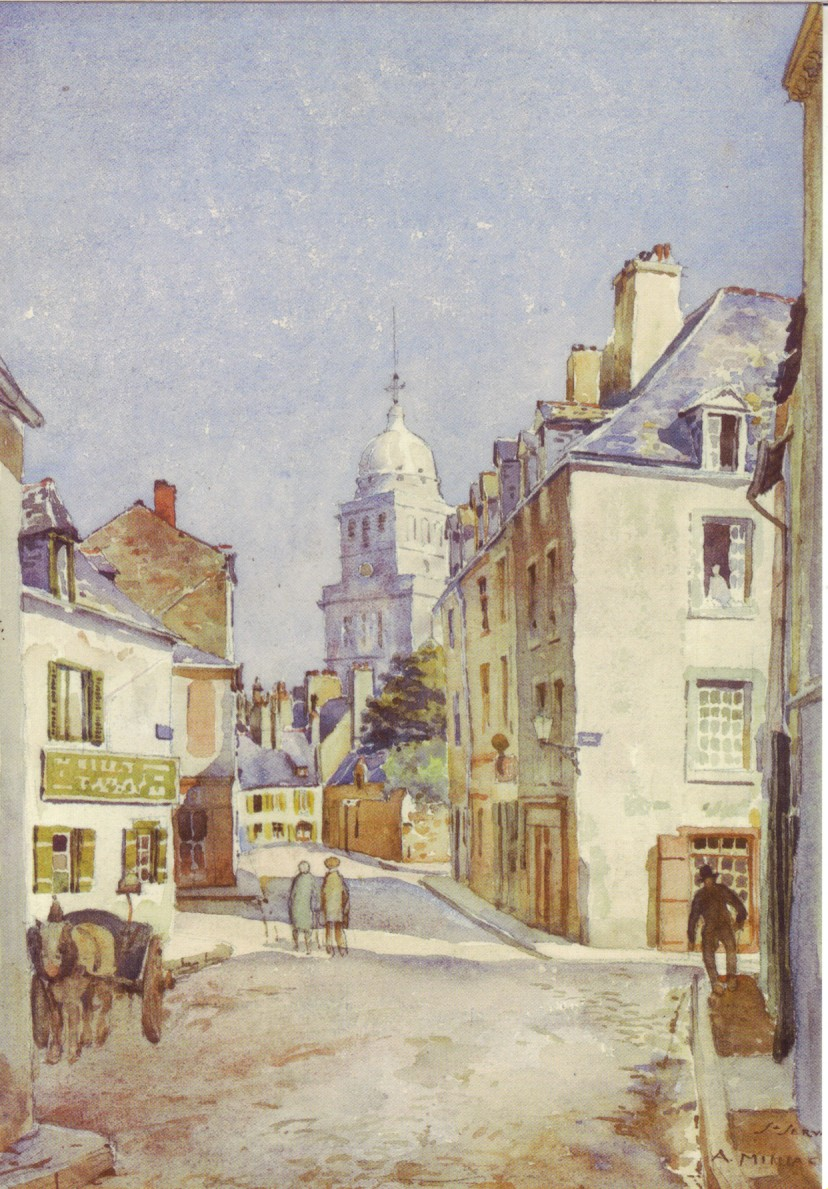
Sainte-Croix church about Ernest Lamort street, at Saint-Malo, France. Watercolor by Alexandre Miniac.

One of the buildings designed by Alexandre Miniac is the town hall of Albert, a town in northern France. By decree of December 12, 2023, this building was listed as a historic monument. This served as official recognition for the building which was celebrating its 92nd anniversary.
