= Armand Bouchart =

Armand Bouchart was a Knight Templar who commanded a small garrison during the Templar rule of Cyprus in 1192.

== Biography ==
Nothing is known about Bouchart's life other than his command of the Templar garrison based in Cyprus. At that period, the Templar Grand Master, Robert de Sablé, could not afford to leave a huge garrison on Cyprus, due to the Templars being required to fight battles elsewhere as part of the Third Crusade. All that remained on Cyprus was a force of approximately 14 to 20 Templars, with Bouchart among them. Still, this small garrison was strong enough to occupy the entire island. However, the men sent to look after the island were warriors, not administrators, and soon after their arrival, they began disrespecting the local population and taking whatever they wanted.

This ill treatment of the Cypriots soon reached its peak and the populace revolted. Bouchart and his knights sought shelter in the local Templar castle in order to regroup. They bolted out of the castle in full armor and assaulted the Cypriots. The massacre was over in minutes and the revolt was halted for the time being. Bouchart told de Sablé that his small number of men was insufficient to hold the island and that another revolt must surely be around the corner. It was then decided that Cyprus was not worth keeping anymore, and the island was soon sold to Guy of Lusignan.

== In popular culture ==
Armand Bouchart is featured as the main antagonist of the video game Assassin's Creed: Bloodlines, in which he is shown succeeding Robert de Sablé as the de facto Grand Master of the Templar Order after the latter's death. He assembles a large army of Templars on Cyprus, both to solidify the Order's control over the island, and to relocate the contents of the Templar Archive—a hidden underground vault containing various items of high importance to the Templars—to a more secure location. Bouchart is eventually killed during a confrontation with the protagonist Altaïr Ibn-La'Ahad inside the Archive in 1193.
