= Abbey of St Vincent, Laon =

Abbey in Aisne, France

Coordinates: 49.5564°N 3.6169°E

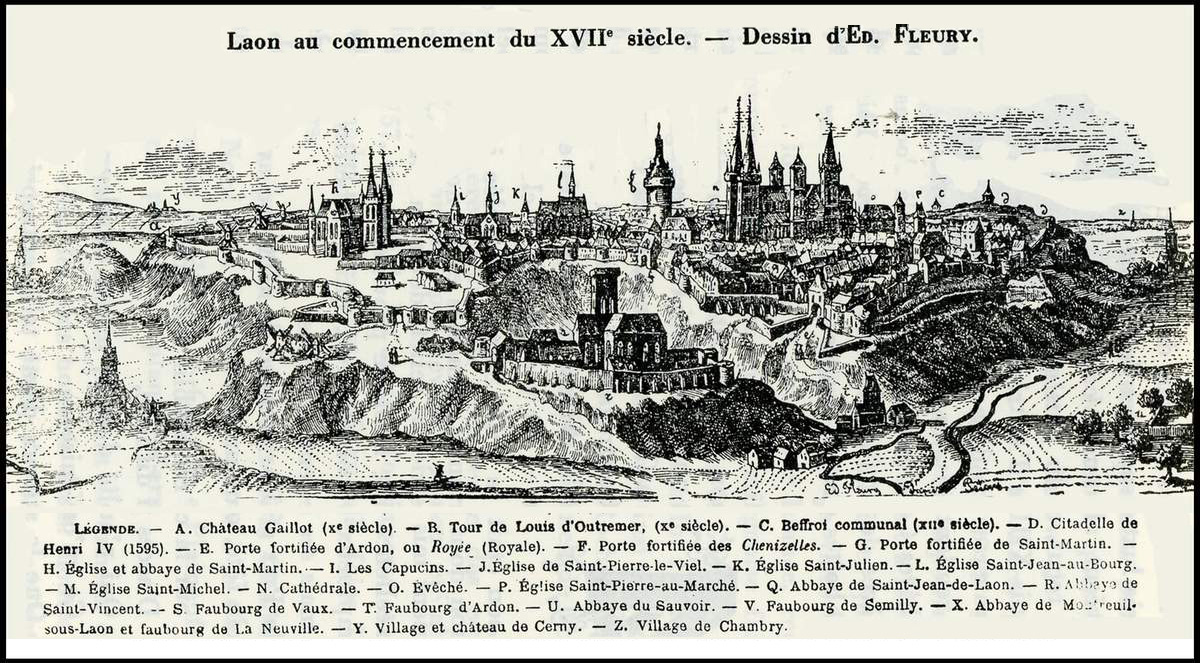
View of Laon with the abbey in the foreground (drawing by Fleury, 17th century)

The Abbey of St. Vincent, Laon (French: Abbaye Saint-Vincent de Laon) was a Benedictine monastery in Laon, Picardy, northern France.

== History ==
The abbey was founded in c. 580 and initially followed the Rule of St. Columbanus, adopting the Rule of St. Benedict in 948.

In November 882, after the monks had been decimated by the Viking invaders, the abbey was sacked, pillaged, burned and ruined. A few years later, Bishop Didon had the church rebuilt and settled a dozen monks here again. In 925, Bishop Adelhelm took advantage of a visit by King Rudolf and obtained privileges from him for the new church to be built. The chronicler Aimoin of Fleury reports that King Louis IV was anointed king in the abbey in 936 by Archbishop Artald of Reims. A little later, the church outside the city was plundered once again by Hugh the Great during his unsuccessful siege of Laon in the battle against Louis IV.

Bishop Rorico, an illegitimate son of Charles III and half-brother of Louis IV, sent for twelve Benedictine monks from Fleury Abbey who were subject to the more moderate Benedictine rule. On 26 September 987, the privileges granted by his predecessors were confirmed by King Hugh Capet. In 1072, Bishop Helinand consecrated a new monastery church, and in 1082 Abbot Adalbero had the abbey surrounded by a wall, also to separate the monastery precinct from the town, which in the meantime had grown right up to the abbey. In 1145, the church caught fire during a storm. Reconstruction did not begin until 1175. Pope Alexander III placed the abbey directly under the Holy See in 1171, thus emphasizing its importance.

A 13th-century wall painting to the left of the altar was discovered in 1769 by Canon Villette (archdeacon of the church of Laon) showing three generations of the chevaliers d'Eppes (Jehan died in 1273, a younger Jehan who died in 1293, and a third family member with no epitaph).

In 1359 during the Hundred Years War the troops of Edward III of England attacked a poorly fortified part of the town called la Villette and set fire to the abbey, destroying its rich library. Only 257 manuscripts were saved, fifty of which are now in the Laon City Library, and a few more in the Royal Library of Belgium.

In 1520, Abbot Jean Charpentier had the church façade renovated and the vaults of the nave rebuilt. He was the last regular abbot of Saint-Vincent, after him the abbey was subjected to the system of commendatory abbots.

Geoffroy de Billy, later député aux états-généraux for the region of Blois from 1576 to 1577, became abbot of Saint-Vincent and also of abbey of Saint-Jean, Amiens. In 1561, he fought against Protestantism when he was involved in the case of Nicole Aubrey, at which time he exorcised 30 devils, including four from Nicole herself.

In 1594, King Henry IV set up his general quarters in the abbey during the siege of Laon. In order to increase the range of his guns, he had some of them placed on the vaults of the church, which were thus subjected to strong vibrations. As a result of the next siege of Laon, that of 1618, the nave and the bell tower collapsed. The church was not rebuilt for the time being, so that from then on services were held inside the church but in the open air. It was not until 1640 that reconstruction began, which ended in 1771 with the completion of the three-gabled abbot's palace.

The abbey was suppressed during the French Revolution. Many of the buildings were dismantled and the materials sold off, and others were destroyed later in the 19th century, leaving the abbot's lodging as the only surviving structure. Permission for demolition was issued in 2007. A fire on 14 June 2008, apparently arson, caused serious damage.

== Gallery ==
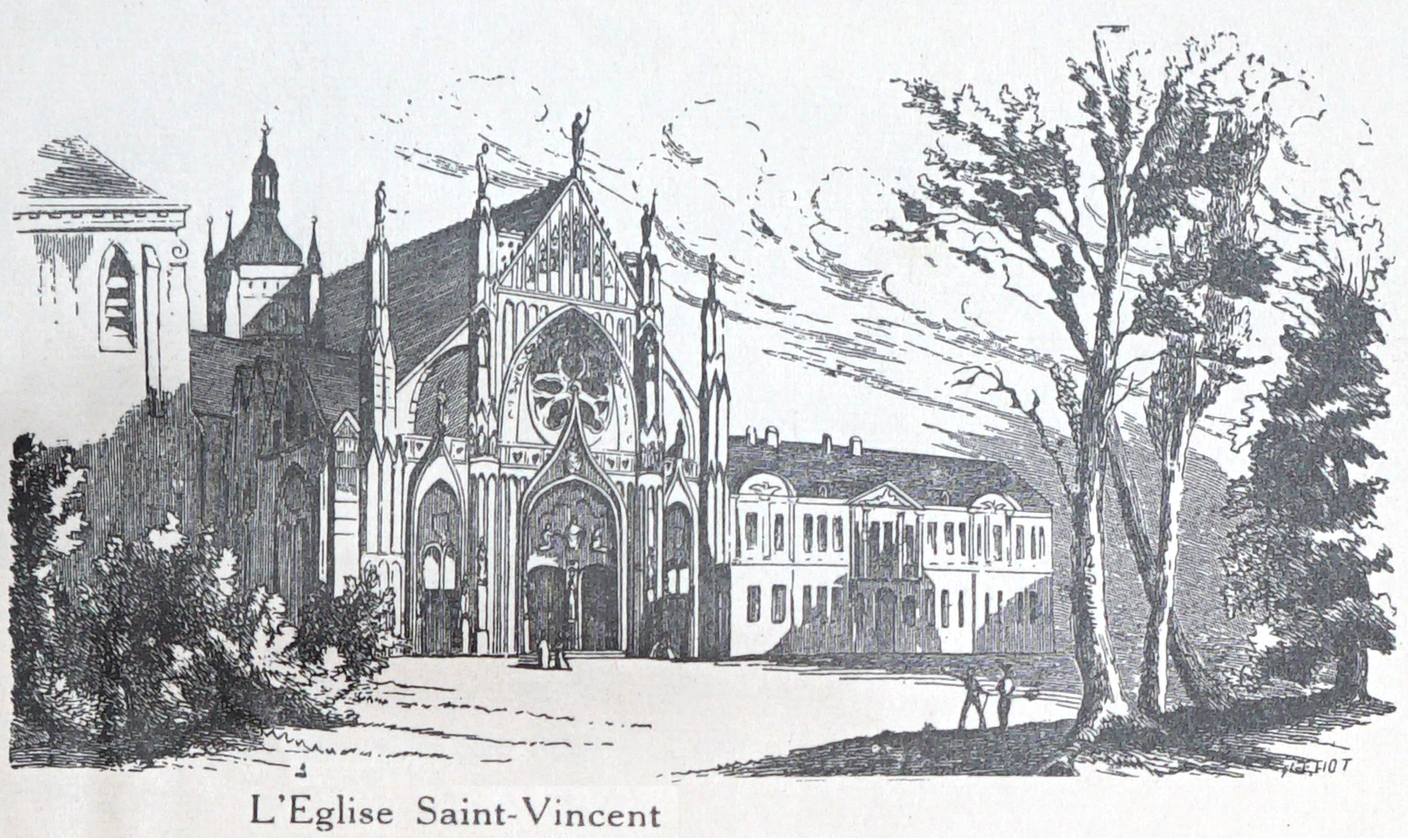
View of the former abbey and the church

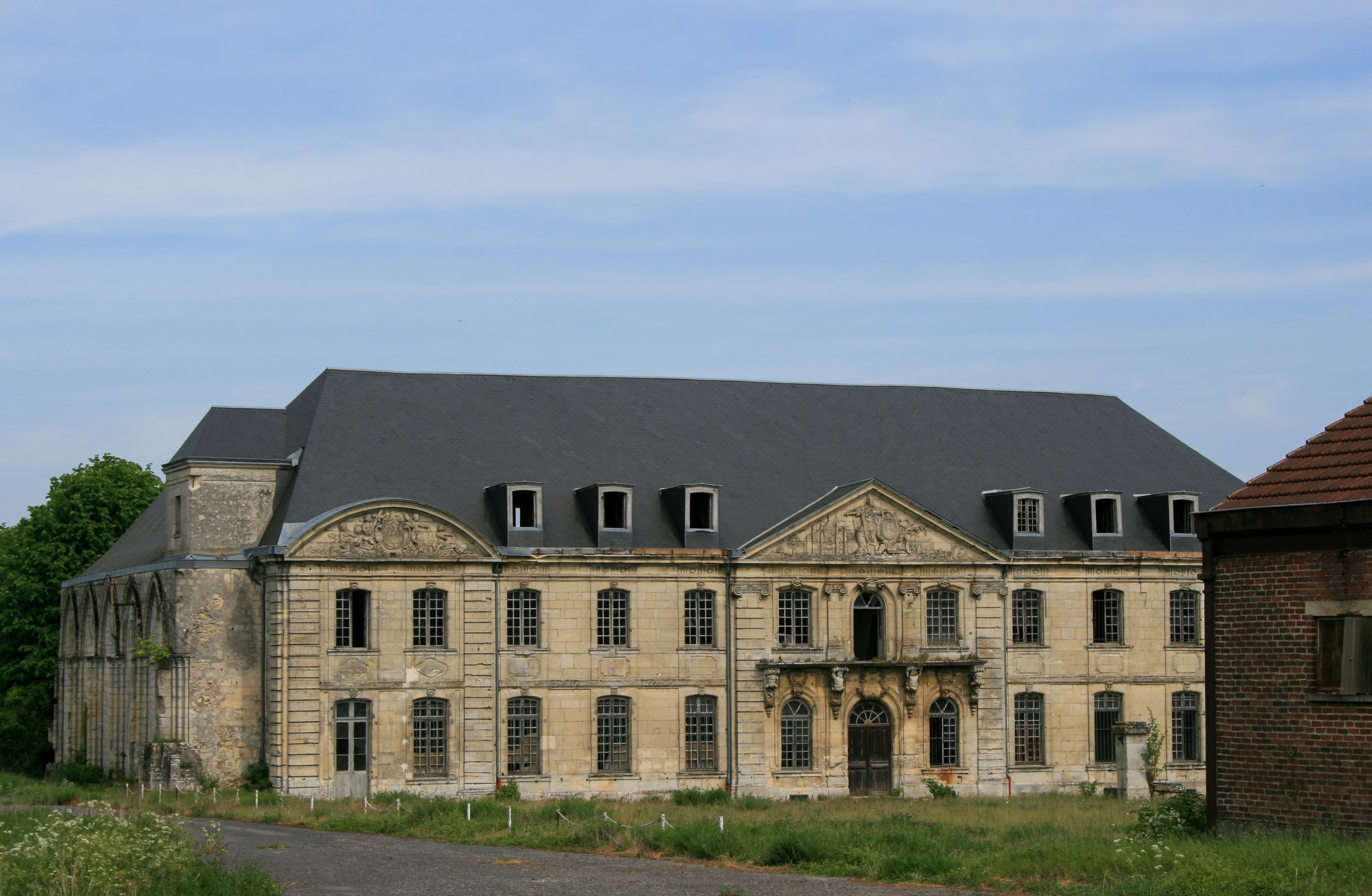
The building in 2007

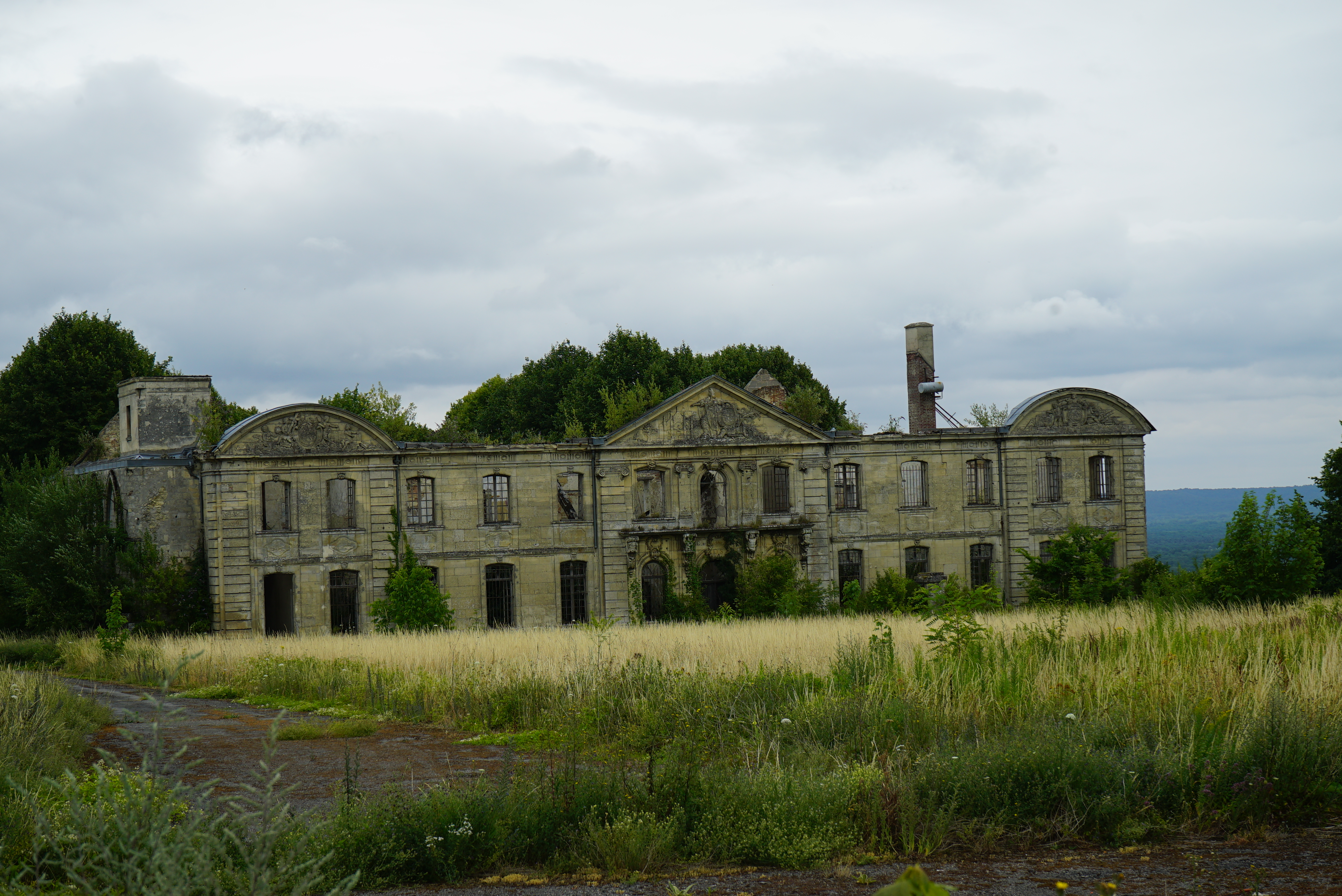
Façade of the abbot's lodging after the fire of 2008

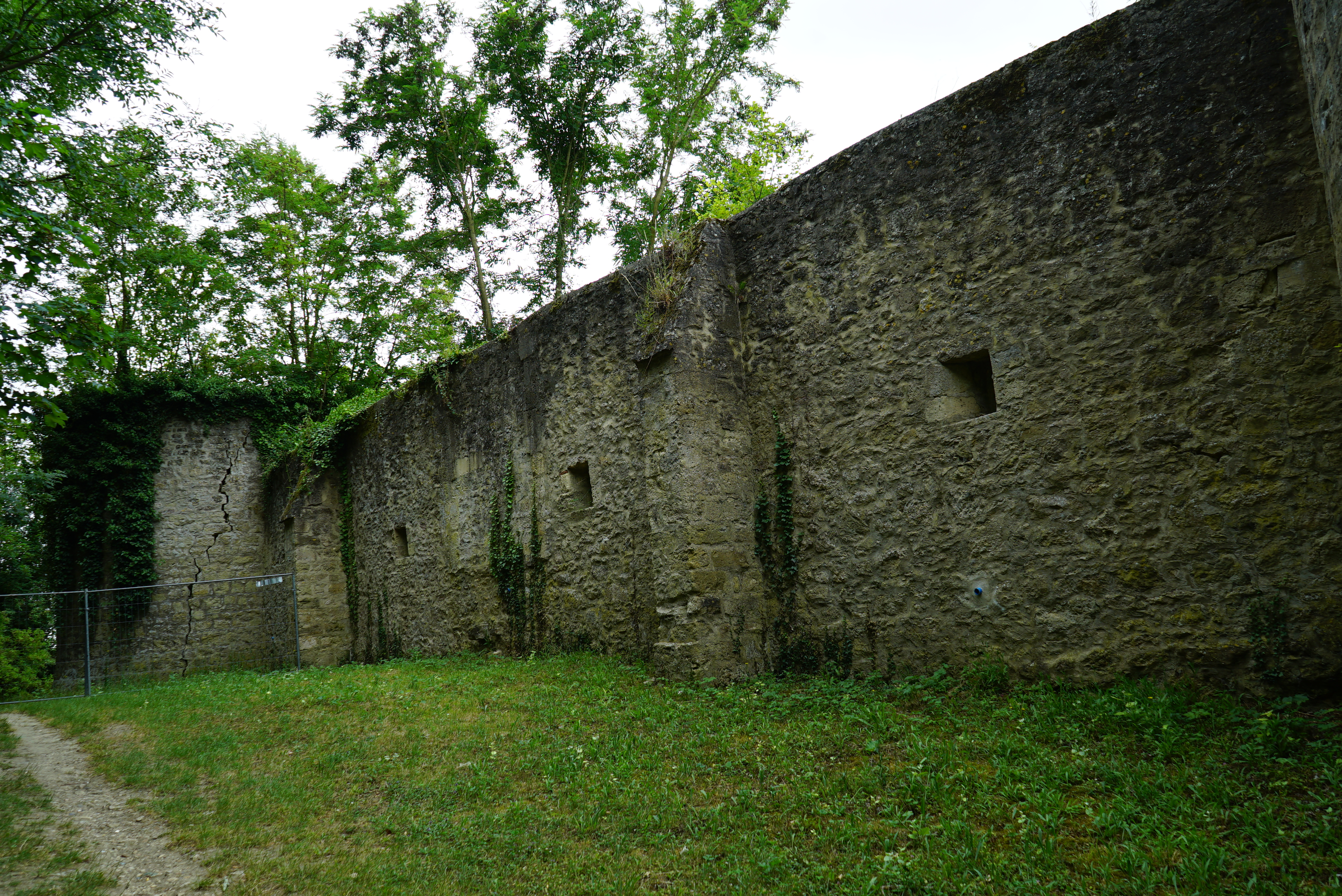
Abbey wall forming part of the ramparts of Laon

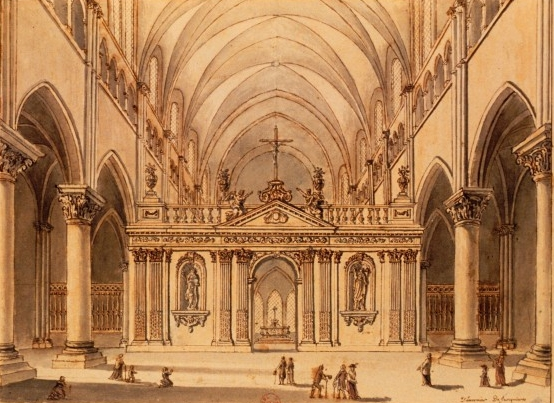
Abbey church interior 1860

== Sources ==
- Wyard, Dom Robert (1858). Histoire de l'abbaye de Saint-Vincent de Laon. (1re éd. v. 1680/1685)
