= Matthieu Bochart =

French Protestant minister

Matthieu Bochart (c. 19 March 1619 — 1662) was a French Protestant minister at Alençon from 1635-1662.

== Career ==
Bochart published Traité contre les Reliqiues and Traité contre le sucrifice de la Messe. Judicial proceedings were commenced against him for having used the forbidden title of pastors for Protestant ministers. He published Dialogue sur les difficultés que les Missionnaires font aux Protestant de France. This dialogue on the tolerance of Lutheran errors inspired the Elector Palatine to try and unite the two reformed churches in Germany, the Lutheran and the Calvinist churches. Palatine advocated their union in the assembly of Protestant princes at Frankfurt. Upon hearing this, Matthieu Bochart published his Dialectician, a conciliatory treatise, in 1662, which he dedicated to Palatine. It contains the plan of this projected union. Matthieu's cousin is the more well-known Samuel Bochart.

== Works ==
- Bochart, Mathieu (1649). Exposition naïve de l'efficace ou des usages de la Sainte Cène (in French).
- Bochart, Matthieu (1656). Traité de l'origine du Service des Reliques (in French).
- Bochart, Mathieu (1658). Traitté du sacrifice de la messe monstrant par les Pères et par les docteurs de l'Eglise... que la doctrine de l'Eglise romaine... est fort nouvelle (in French).
- Bochart, Matthieu (1658). Eclaircissement de la question pourquoy le synode national tenu à Charenton l'an 1631 a admis à sa communion les Lutheriens plutost que ceux de l'Eglise Romain (in Greek).
- Bochart, Mathieu (1660). Preservatif contre le scandale que donne la revolte des pasteurs, ou Sermon sur le chapitre xi. de la premiere Epistre de S. Paul aux Corithiens (in French). par Louis Vendosme.
- Bochart, Matthieu (1660). Sermon du jusne pron. à Alençon (in French).
- Bochart, Mathieu (1662). Response de monsieur Bochart, ministre à Caen, a la lettre de monsieur de la Barre, jesuite. En laquelle est refuté clairement ce qu'on objecte aujour'hui touchant l'admission des Lutheriens paisibles à nôtre communion (in French). pour Iean Antoine & Samuel De Tournes.
- Diallacticon, seu tractatus de conciliandis in religionis negotio Protestantium animis (1662)
