= Saint-Michel-en-Thiérache Abbey =

Abbey in Aisne, France

Coordinates: 49°55′39″N 4°08′05″E

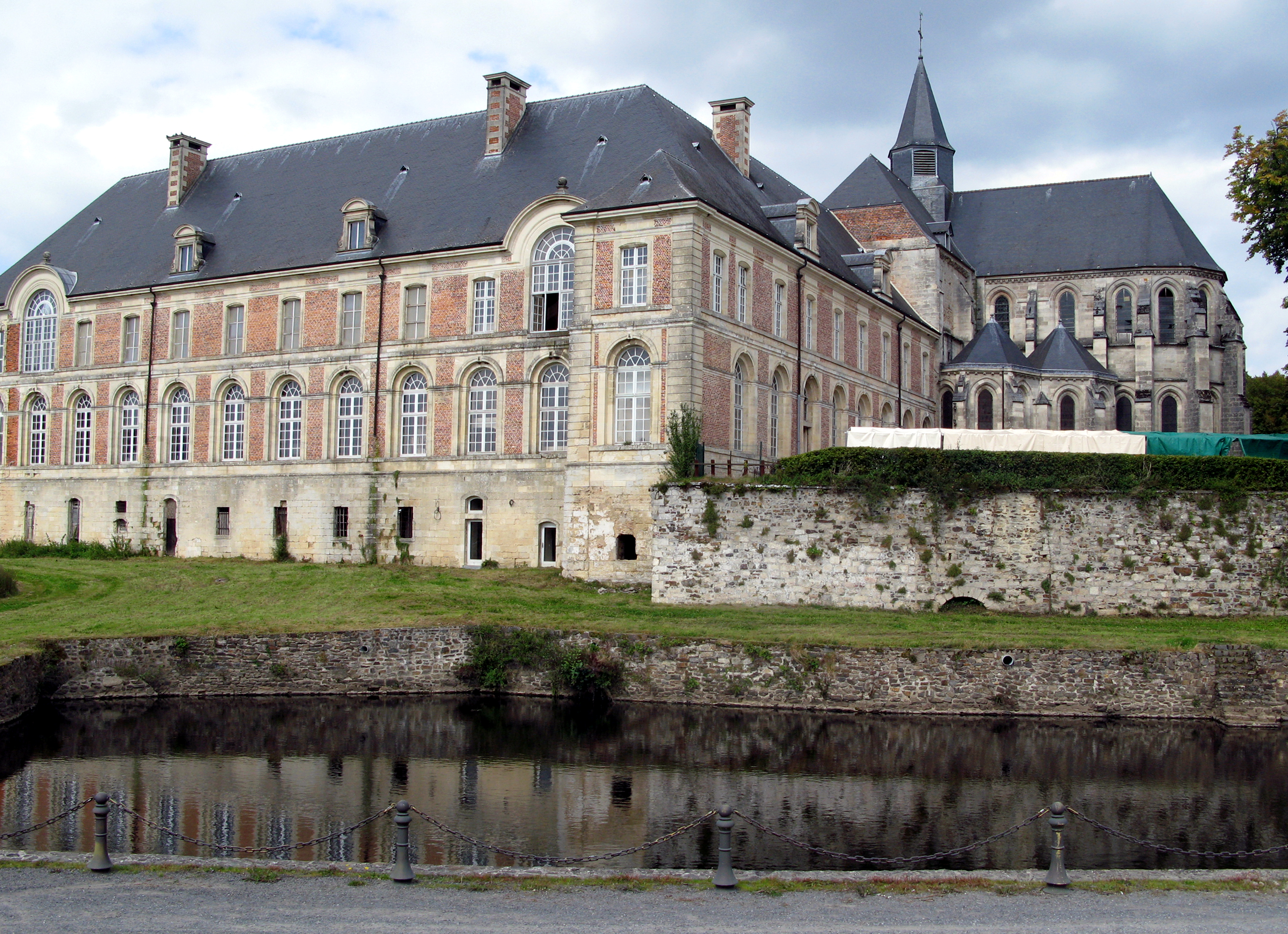
Saint-Michel-en-Thiérache Abbey.

The former Benedictine Abbey of Saint-Michel-en-Thiérache is located in Saint-Michel, in the Thiérache (Aisne, Picardy), between Paris and Brussels.

== History ==
The first chapel was founded in 693 A.D on the initiative of Ursmar. All current abbey, which includes the church, the cloister and outbuildings, dating back to the twelfth century. The abbey has since its inception undergone various reconstructions and rebuilds. The transept and the choir of the church, and the bays of the chapter house are Gothic and date from the late twelfth century. In the early seventeenth century, Father Jean-Baptiste de Mornat, priest of Venetian origin arrived in France in the suite of Marie de' Medici, chaplain and counselor of Kings Henri IV and Louis XIII, restores the abbey. The facade and nave date from the classic Abbot Mornat. The monastic buildings around the cloister were rebuilt in the eighteenth century.

== Artworks and outstanding objects ==
An outstanding set of murals depicting the life of St. Benedict dating from the sixteenth century was unearthed in the north gallery of the cloister and was the subject of a restoration. The church also houses an early 18th-century (1714) organ built by Jean Boizard, which was made a historical monument in 1950 and is maintained and used today. According to the researcher Alain Gigot, the church had been closed since 1837 and listed on the inventory of historical monuments in 1927. A festival of music and singing is held annually in June and July.
