= Pecquencourt =

- Commune
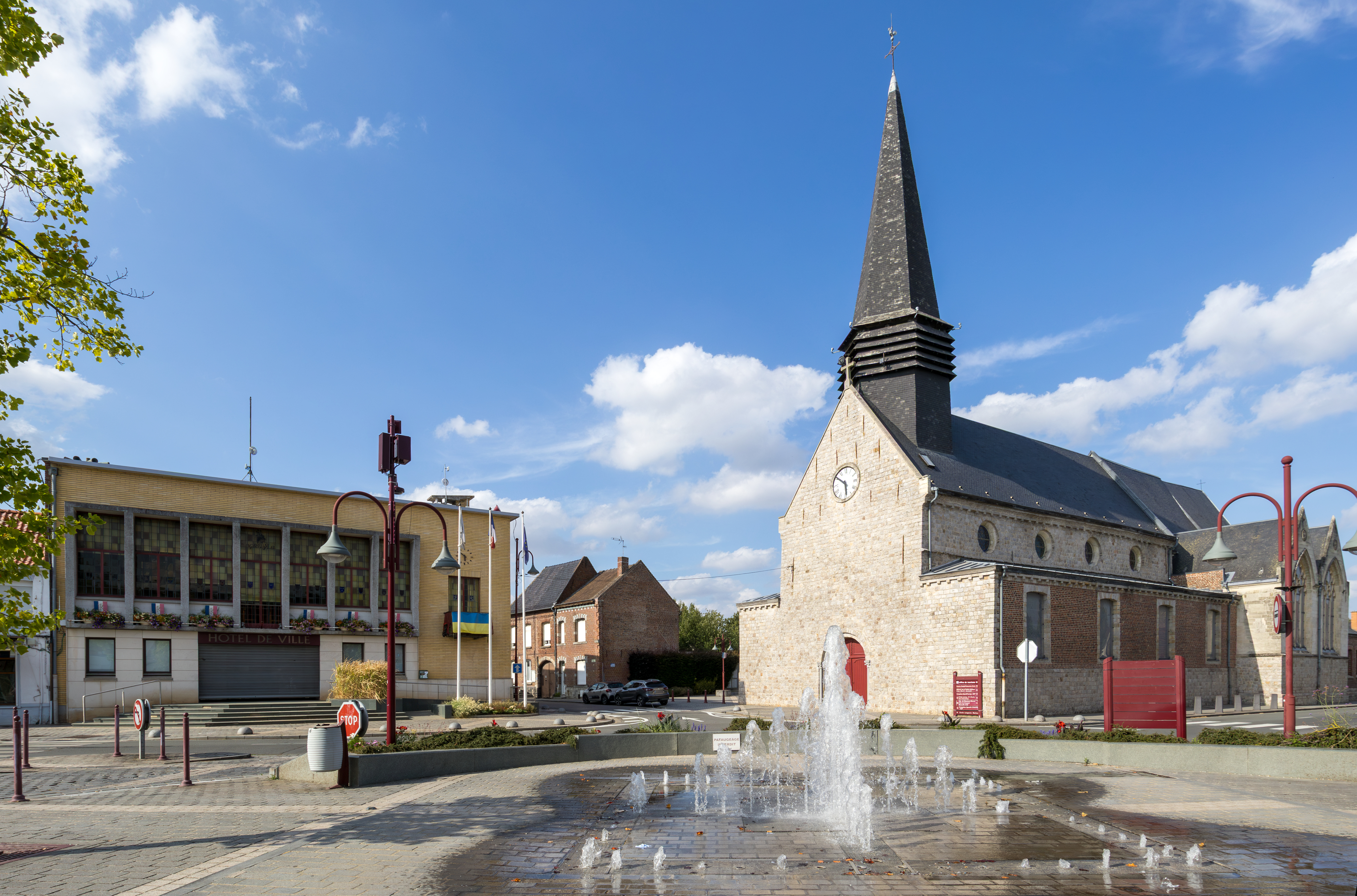
- The town hall and the church in Pecquencourt

- Coat of arms
- Location of Pecquencourt
- Location within France Location within Hauts-de-France
- Coordinates: 50°22′41″N 3°12′59″E
- Country: France
- Region: Hauts-de-France
- Department: Nord
- Arrondissement: Douai
- Canton: Sin-le-Noble
- Intercommunality: Cœur d'Ostrevent

Government
  - Mayor (2020–2026): Joël Pierrache
- Area^{1}: 9.6 km^{2} (3.7 sq mi)
- Elevation: 20 m (66 ft)
- Highest elevation: 27 m (89 ft)
- Lowest elevation: 16 m (52 ft)
- Population (2023): 6,092
  - Density: 630/km^{2} (1,600/sq mi)
- Time zone: UTC+01:00 (CET)
  - Summer (DST): UTC+02:00 (CEST)
- INSEE/Postal code: 59456 /59146
- ^{1} French Land Register data, which excludes lakes, ponds, glaciers > 1 km^{2} (0.386 sq mi or 247 acres) and river estuaries.

Pecquencourt (French pronunciation: [pɛkɑ̃kuʁ]) is a commune in the Nord department in northern France.

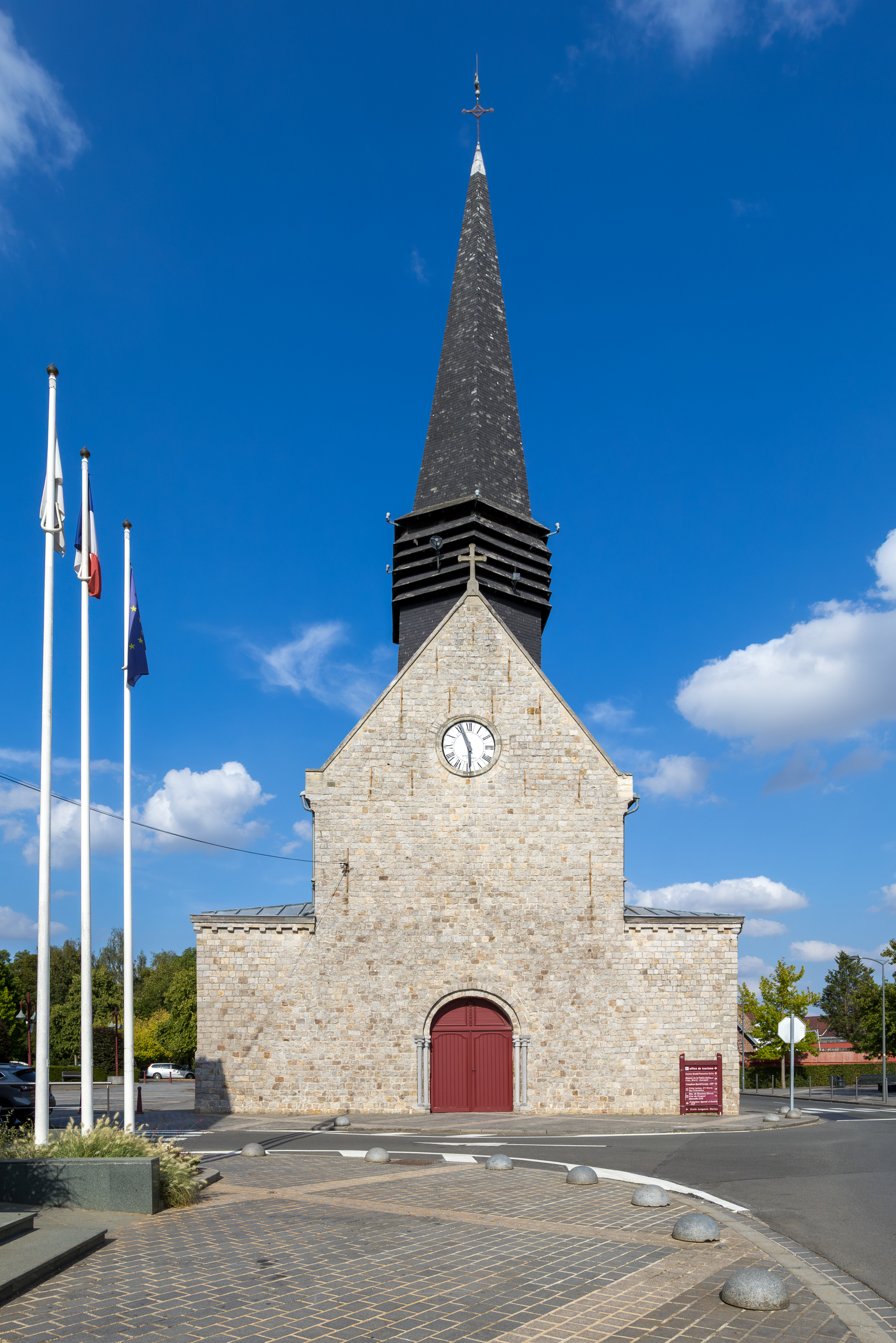
Bell church of Saint-Gilles de Pecquencourt

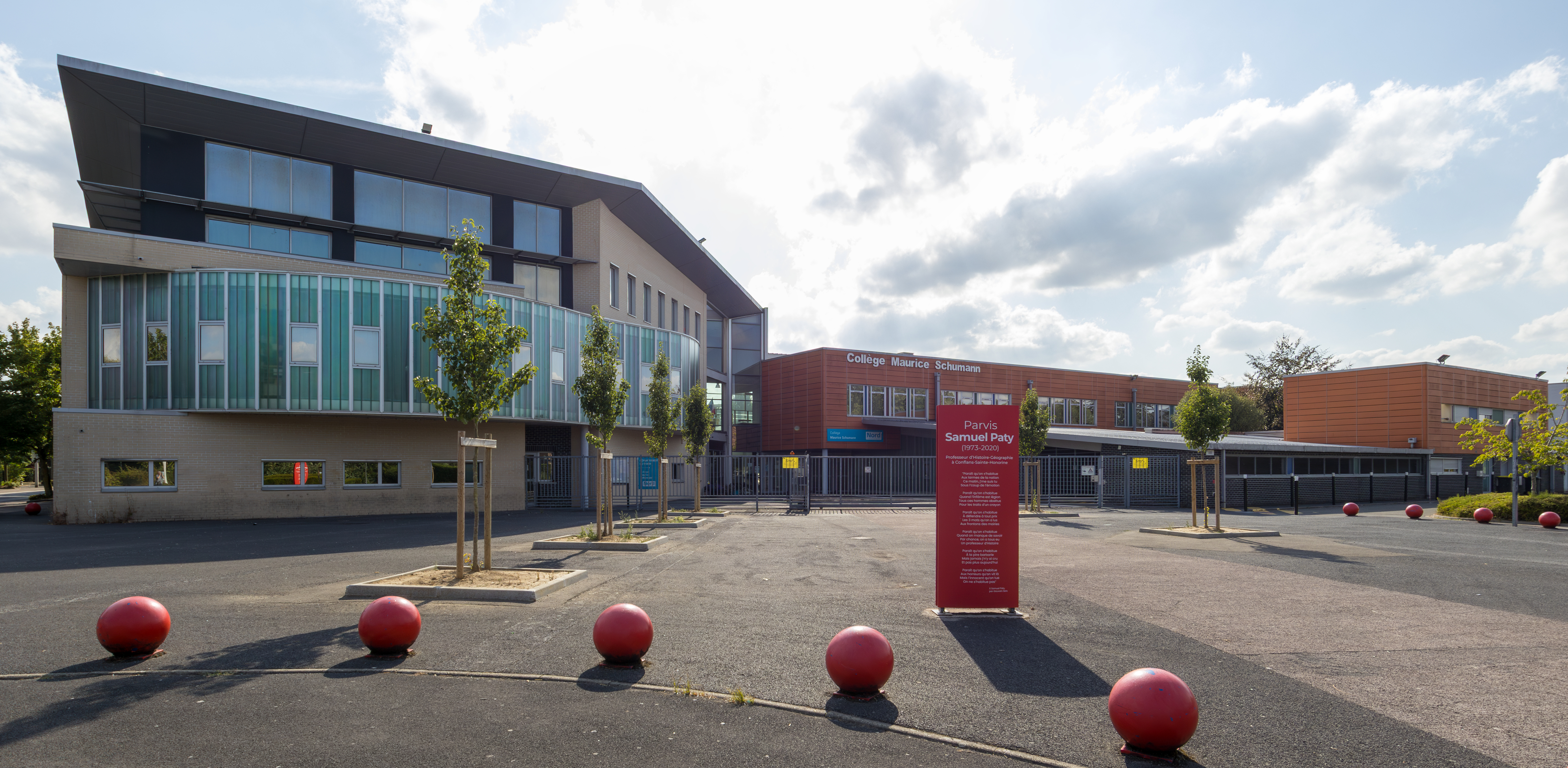
Maurice Schumann College and Samuel Paty Park.

== Geography ==
=== Climate ===
Pecquencourt has an oceanic climate (Köppen climate classification Cfb). The average annual temperature in Pecquencourt is 10.8 °C (51.4 °F). The average annual rainfall is 743.8 mm (29.28 in) with July as the wettest month. The temperatures are highest on average in July, at around 18.6 °C (65.5 °F), and lowest in January, at around 3.6 °C (38.5 °F). The highest temperature ever recorded in Pecquencourt was 41.6 °C (106.9 °F) on 25 July 2019; the coldest temperature ever recorded was −19.0 °C (−2.2 °F) on 17 January 1985.

Climate data for Pecquencourt (1981−2010 normals, extremes 1962−2019)
Month	Jan	Feb	Mar	Apr	May	Jun	Jul	Aug	Sep	Oct	Nov	Dec	Year
Record high °C (°F)	18.5 (65.3)	20.4 (68.7)	24.0 (75.2)	28.5 (83.3)	32.1 (89.8)	34.7 (94.5)	41.6 (106.9)	37.0 (98.6)	34.4 (93.9)	29.4 (84.9)	21.5 (70.7)	15.8 (60.4)	41.6 (106.9)
Mean daily maximum °C (°F)	6.4 (43.5)	7.4 (45.3)	11.1 (52.0)	14.8 (58.6)	18.5 (65.3)	21.2 (70.2)	23.8 (74.8)	23.6 (74.5)	20.1 (68.2)	15.6 (60.1)	10.2 (50.4)	6.7 (44.1)	15.0 (59.0)
Daily mean °C (°F)	3.6 (38.5)	4.0 (39.2)	7.1 (44.8)	9.7 (49.5)	13.5 (56.3)	16.3 (61.3)	18.6 (65.5)	18.3 (64.9)	15.2 (59.4)	11.5 (52.7)	7.0 (44.6)	4.1 (39.4)	10.8 (51.4)
Mean daily minimum °C (°F)	0.7 (33.3)	0.7 (33.3)	3.1 (37.6)	4.7 (40.5)	8.4 (47.1)	11.3 (52.3)	13.4 (56.1)	13.0 (55.4)	10.3 (50.5)	7.3 (45.1)	3.8 (38.8)	1.5 (34.7)	6.5 (43.7)
Record low °C (°F)	−19.0 (−2.2)	−12.6 (9.3)	−12.0 (10.4)	−6.0 (21.2)	−4.0 (24.8)	1.0 (33.8)	3.0 (37.4)	3.0 (37.4)	−1.0 (30.2)	−7.5 (18.5)	−9.0 (15.8)	−14.2 (6.4)	−19.0 (−2.2)
Average precipitation mm (inches)	58.1 (2.29)	48.6 (1.91)	58.3 (2.30)	46.6 (1.83)	61.0 (2.40)	69.8 (2.75)	72.4 (2.85)	67.8 (2.67)	57.7 (2.27)	68.3 (2.69)	67.9 (2.67)	67.3 (2.65)	743.8 (29.28)
Average precipitation days (≥ 1.0 mm)	12.0	10.0	11.6	9.7	10.8	9.7	9.8	8.9	9.6	11.3	12.2	12.6	128.3
Source: Météo-France

== Population ==
Historical population
Year	Pop.	±% p.a.
1968	8,911	—
1975	7,934	−1.65%
1982	7,387	−1.02%
1990	6,718	−1.18%
1999	6,361	−0.60%
2007	5,990	−0.75%
2012	6,011	+0.07%
2017	6,011	+0.00%
2023	6,092	+0.22%
Source: INSEE

== Heraldry ==
Arms of Pecquencourt	The arms of Pecquencourt are blazoned : Azure semy de lys Or, a stag argent. (Capelle, Loffre, Neuville-Saint-Rémy, Pecquencourt, and Vred use the same arms.)

== Sister cities ==
- Sondershausen, Germany

== See also ==
- Communes of the Nord department
