= Adrienne Marie Louise Grandpierre-Deverzy =

French painter (1798 – 1869)

- Born: 1798; Tonnerre, France
- Died: 1869 (aged 70–71); Paris, France
- Known for: Painting
- Spouse: Abel de Pujol (m. 1856)

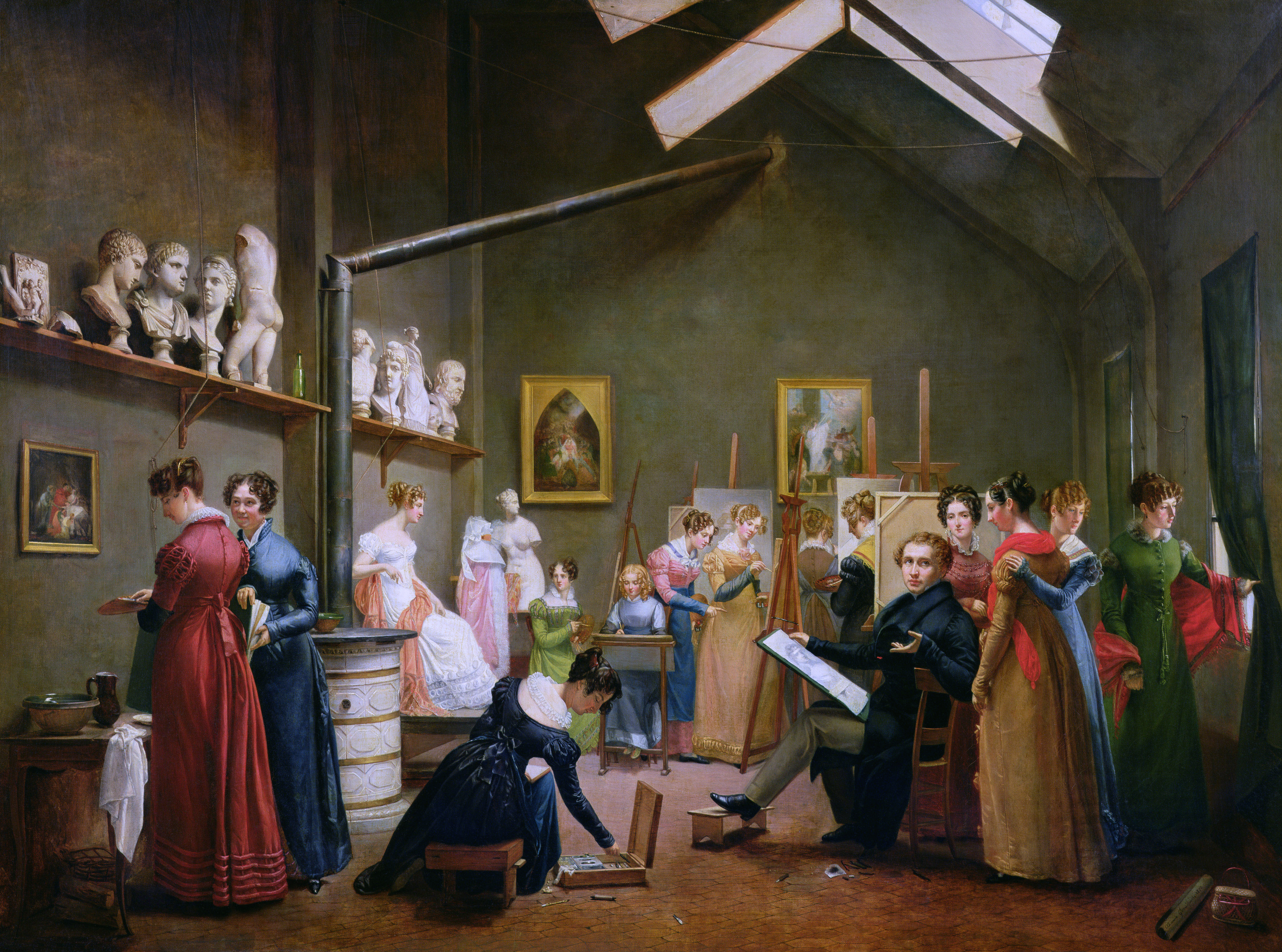
The Studio of Abel de Pujol, Musée Marmottan Monet

Adrienne Marie Louise Grandpierre-Deverzy (1798–1869) was a French painter. She was a student of the painter Abel de Pujol (1787–1861), who had studied with Jacques-Louis David. In 1856, she married Pujol. Known for her genre and historical paintings in the Troubadour style, she also taught female students in Pujol's art studio and was considered a committed instructor.

== Life and career ==
Grandpierre-Deverzy was born in Tonnerre, Yonne. She always exhibited under her maiden name, and made her debut in the Salon of 1822 with The Studio of Abel de Pujol; this work was one of several images of Pujol's studio that she produced over the course of her career. Inspired by her work teaching in Pujol's studio, this painting depicts Pujol critiquing a canvas while a group of young female art students surround him and work on various paintings, select paints, and daydream out the window. "Gender-appropriate instructional aids abound, including the clothed female model seated in the left rear corner, copies after three identifiable religious paintings by Pujol, who specialized in that genre, and a shelf of plaster casts with a male nude torso turned decorously, if playfully, toward the wall."

Grandpierre-Deverzy depicts a very different view of her husband at work in his studio in her 1836 painting Workshop of Abel de Pujol. In this painting, Pujol's face is hidden by a large canvas as he paints a semi-nude model, who is turned away from the audience and from the artist herself. This gesture of modesty, as well as the nude male sculpture in the background whose arm obscures his genitals, are examples of the limitations placed on women artists due to the social mores and moral proprieties of the 19th century.

Grandpierre-Deverzy also painted interiors and literary subjects, including one painting based on Sir Walter Scott's Quentin Durward. Other historical and literary scenes include View of a Portion of the Chateau of Fontainebleau, which depicts the Marquis Monaldeschi supplicating Queen Christina of Sweden for mercy, and a scene from the 18th century novel The Adventures of Gil Blas of Santillane. Her work was frequently exhibited at the Paris Salons between 1822 and 1855 and included historical subjects, portraits, and genre paintings. Associated with the Troubadour style, Grandpierre-Deverzy is known for narrative paintings depicting subjects drawn from modern European history and literature. She received a silver medal from the Societé des amis des arts of Cambrai, France in 1828. She died in Paris.

== List of paintings ==
- Paris, Musée Marmottan Monet, The Studio of Abel de Pujol, 1822, oil on canvas, 96 cm by 129 cm.
- Palace of Fontainebleau, Musée National du Château de Fontainebleau, View of a Part of the Château Fontainebleau, 1824, oil on canvas, 1.030 m by 0.830 m. Alternate titles: Monaldeschi imploring the grace of Christina of Sweden at Fontainebleau or Vue d'une partie du château de fontainebleau-Christine, reine de Suède, fait assssiner son grand écuyer Monaldeschi.
- Valenciennes, Musée des Beaux-Arts, The Workshop of Abel de Pujol, 1836, oil on canvas, 0.950 m by 1.300 m.
- France, Musée Louis-Phillippe, Alexander Farnese, Duke of Parma, 1800s, 65 cm by 53.5 cm, copy of Otto van Veen's original portrait 1592.
