= Richet =

Richet is a French surname. Notable people with the surname include:

- Charles Richet (1850–1935), French physiologist
- Jean-François Richet (born 1966), French screenwriter, film director and producer
- Léon Richet (1843-1907), French painter
