= Pauline Eyebe Effa =

Cameroonian teacher, economist, and entrepreneur

- Born: Cameroon
- Education: BA in Modern Literature; MA in Linguistics; DEA in Communication (University of Lille III); Master's in Social Economy and Local Development (University of Valenciennes); PhD studies in Sociology (Catholic University of Lille)

Pauline Eyebe Effa is a Cameroonian teacher, economist, and entrepreneur. She was awarded the Vivendi Universal Prize in 2002.

== Biography ==
=== Early life, education, and career beginnings ===
Pauline Eyebe Effa grew up in Cameroon, Central Africa, and pursued her education in France. She holds a BA degree in Modern Literature, an MA in Linguistics, and a DEA in Communication from the University of Lille III. She also earned a Master's degree in Social Economy and Local Development from the University of Valenciennes. Currently, she is enrolled in a PhD program in Sociology at the Catholic University of Lille.

=== Career ===
She has worked as a teacher in Armentières. In 1998, she founded a social integration enterprise focused on textile recycling. She is the CEO of an NGO dedicated to social and solidarity economy.

== Awards and honors ==
In 2022, she received the Vivendi Universal Prize for entrepreneurship.
