= Vendémiaire Pavot =

French sculptor (1883–1929)

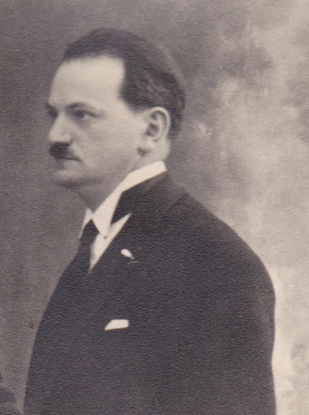
- Born: 30 September 1883; Valenciennes, France
- Died: 18 December 1929 (aged 46)
- Occupation: Sculptor

Vendémiaire Pavot (French: [vɑ̃demjɛʁ pavo]; 30 September 1883 – 18 December 1929) was a French sculptor.

== La Faunesse ==
This 1913 work can be seen in the Valenciennes Jardin de la Rhônelle.

== Edmond Mambré medallion ==
This medallion depicts the Valenciennes musician and dates to 1912. It can be seen in 13, rue Notre-Dame, Valenciennes.

== The façade of Albert's l'hôtel de ville ==
The Albert hôtel de ville was built in the "Flemish" style with art déco influences and was designed by architects Alexandre Miniac and Benjamin Maneval. The building was inaugurated in 1932. Pavot created a moulded cement frieze for the front of the building with 12 panels depicting workers in the fields, industrial scenes and scenes showing a young father going off to war and returning to his family at the end of the war. Albert had been in the thick of fighting throughout the 1914–1918 war.
