= Bruno Lanvin =

Executive director of INSEAD

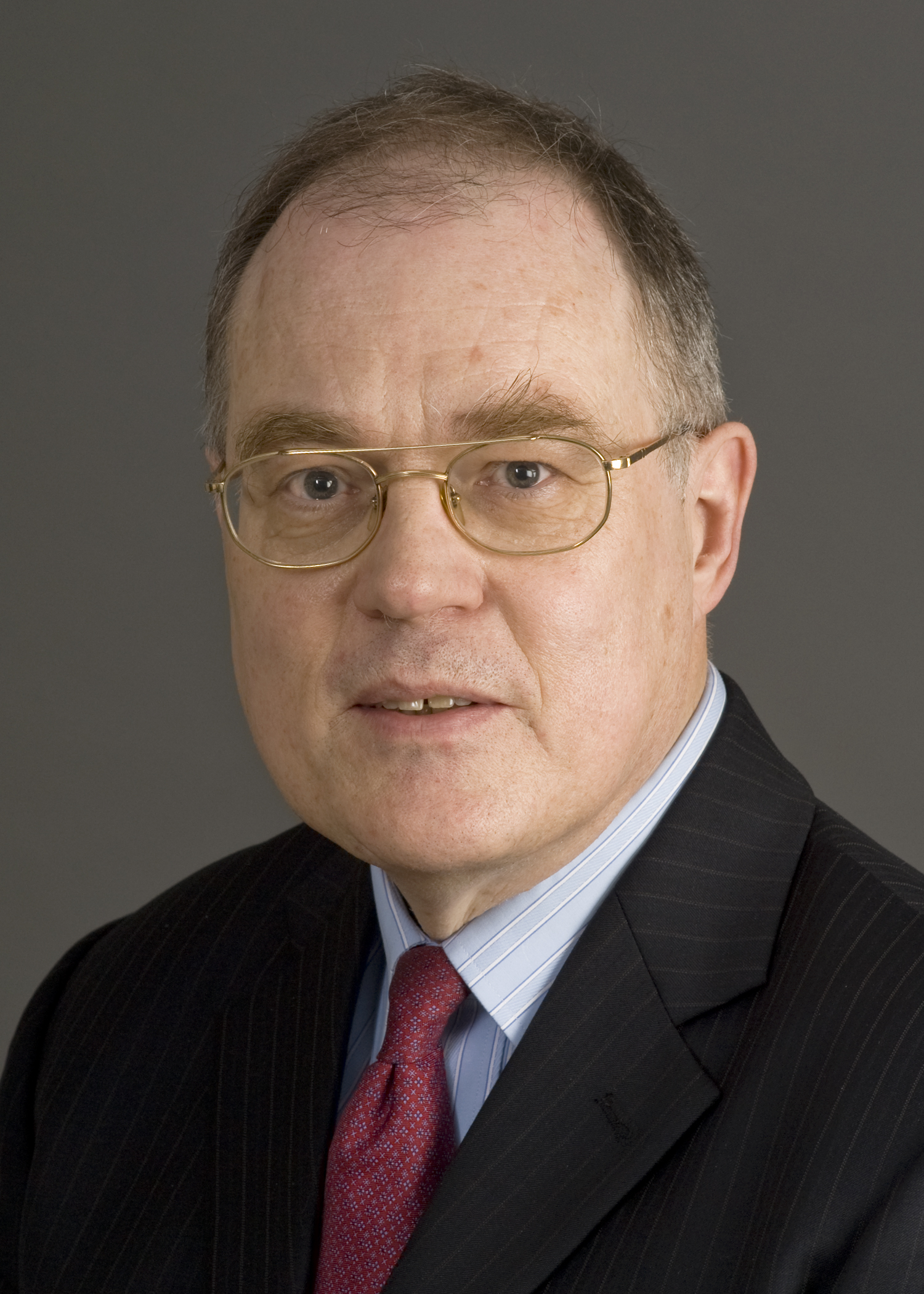
- Born: 14 April 1954 (age 71); Valenciennes - France
- Education: Valenciennes University (BA); HEC Paris (MBA); Sorbonne (PhD)
- Occupation: Researcher - Executive Director

Bruno Lanvin is a French business academic and researcher. He is the Executive Director for Global Indices at INSEAD. From 2007 to 2012, he was the Executive Director of INSEAD’s eLab, managing INSEAD’s teams in Paris, Singapore and Abu Dhabi.

== Biography ==
Lanvin was born on 14 April 1954 in Valenciennes, France. He speaks and writes French, English and Spanish, and has a working knowledge of Italian, Portuguese, Russian and some Chinese.

For more than 20 years with the United Nations, Lanvin worked in a number of capacities with UNCTAD, the UN ICT Task Force, and the UN Department of International Economic and Social Affairs

He holds a BA in Mathematics and Physics from the University of Valenciennes (France), an MBA from Ecole des Hautes Etudes Commerciales in Paris, and a PhD in Economics from the University of Paris (La Sorbonne) in France.

== Research and publications ==
Since 1998, Lanvin has published a significant number of articles on the international aspects of e-commerce, e-government, the new economy and efforts to bridge the so-called ‘digital divide’, and national knowledge/IT strategies.

Since 2002, he has been co-authoring the Global Information Technology Report co-published with the World Economic Forum) and the Global Innovation Index (co-published with the World Intellectual Property Organization). Both reports have been used by several governments around the world in assessing and planning their technology and innovation policies.

Lanvin is also a member of numerous boards, including that of The Mohammed Bin Rashid Centre of Government Innovation in Dubai, ICANN, and the Government Technology Agency of Singapore.

== Bibliography ==
- Lanvin, Bruno; Dutta, Soumitra; Wunsch-Vincent, Sacha (2016). Global Innovation Index 2016: Winning with Global Innovation. Cornell University, INSEAD and the World Intellectual Property Organization (WIPO).
- Baller, Silja; Lanvin, Bruno; Dutta, Soumitra (2016). Innovating in the Digital Economy (PDF). World Economic Forum.

== Lanvin in the media ==
- How do China and India compare in the global race for talent?
- Bruno Lanvin: "What should we teach children? To learn how to learn"
- India innovates
- The World’s Most Innovative Countries 2016
- "En matière d'innovation, il y a un réel effet Macron en France", estime Bruno Lanvin, directeur des indices mondiaux à l’Insead
- Bruno Lanvin - The future of talent and technology
- https://www.euractiv.com/section/economy-jobs/news/claire-workforce-talent-gap-increases-globally-davos-study-finds/
- Singapore top again in Asia-Pacific on global talent index
- Connecting the Rest of the World: Q&A/ A Chat With Insiders Geoffrey Kirkman and Bruno Lanvin," The New York Times/International Herald Tribune, 27 August 2001.
