= Polytechnic University of Hauts-de-France =

University in Valenciennes (France)

Coordinates: 50.3262°N 3.5139°E

Polytechnic University of Hauts-de-France (UPHF)
- Université Polytechnique des Hauts-de-France (UPHF)
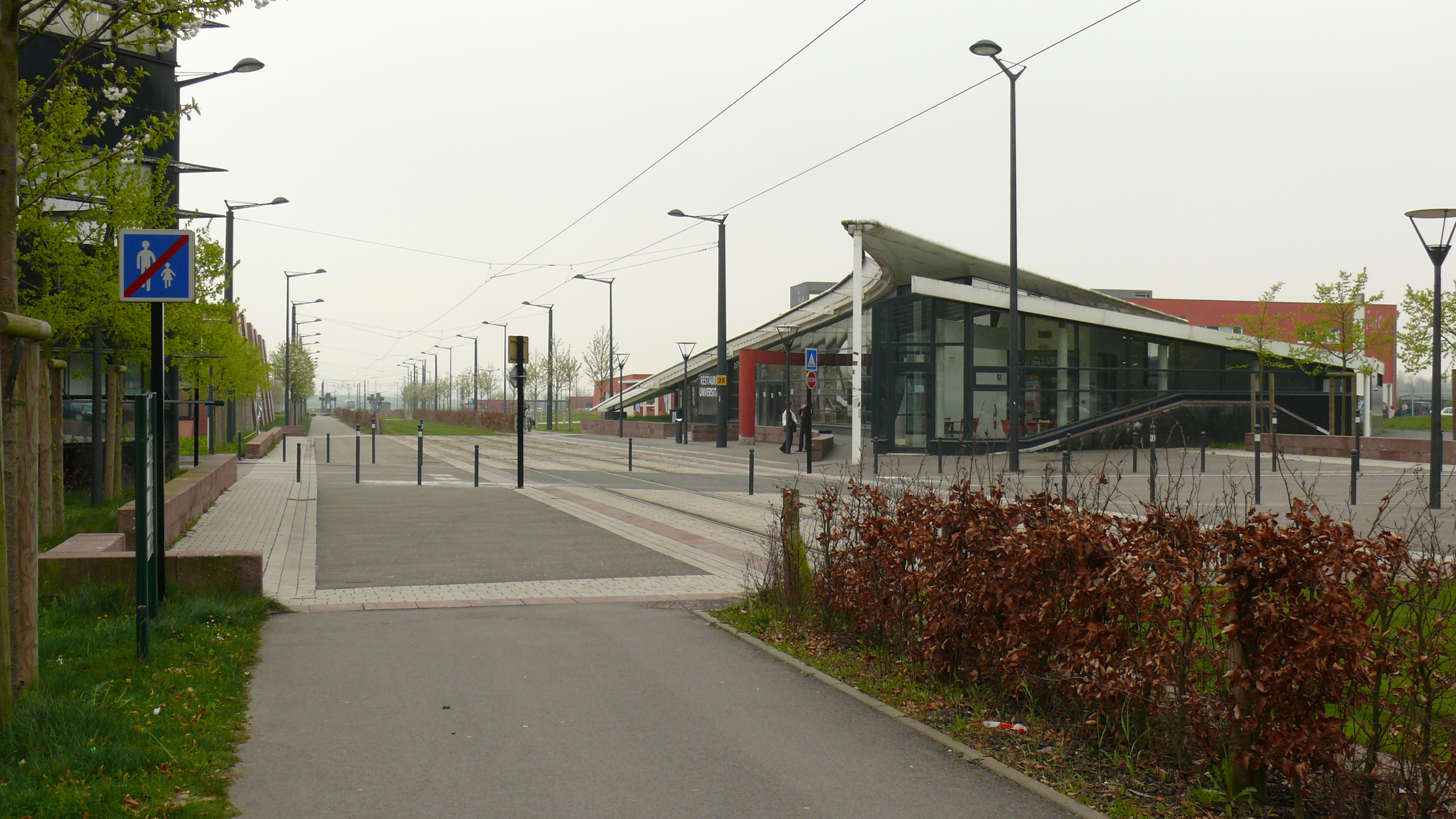
- Type: Public
- Affiliations: Community of Universities and Institutions (COMUE) Lille Nord de France
- Location: Valenciennes, France
- Website: https://www.uphf.fr

The Polytechnic University of Hauts-de-France (Université Polytechnique des Hauts-de-France [ynivɛʁsite pɔlitɛknik de o də fʁɑ̃s], UPHF), previously known as University of Valenciennes and Hainaut-Cambrésis (Université de Valenciennes et du Hainaut-Cambrésis [ynivɛʁsite də valɑ̃sjɛn e dy ɛno kɑ̃bʁezi]) until 1 January 2018, is a French public university, based in Valenciennes. It is under the academy of Lille and is a member of the European Doctoral College Lille-Nord-Pas de Calais and of the Community of Universities and Institutions (COMUE) Lille Nord de France.

== Rankings ==
On a national scale, in terms of graduate's employability, the university ranks first in legal, economic and management training out of 69 universities. In the field of legal training, economics and management, 99% of the university's graduates are employed. Overall, the university is ranked 28th out of 73 universities in France.

== Notable people ==
Faculty

- Stéphane François (born 1973) - political scientist

Alumni

- Édouard Sain (1830, in Cluny, Saône-et-Loire -1910) - artist
- Jean-Marie Teno (born 1954) - Cameroonian film director and filmmaker
- Bruno Lanvin (born 1954, in Valenciennes) - diplomat
- Julien Dive (born 1985, in Saint-Quentin, Aisne) - politician (LR)
- Ndolenodji Alixe Naïmbaye - Chadian politician

== See also ==
- List of public universities in France by academy
- European Doctoral College Lille Nord-Pas de Calais
