= Narcisse Virgilio Díaz =

French painter (1807–1876)

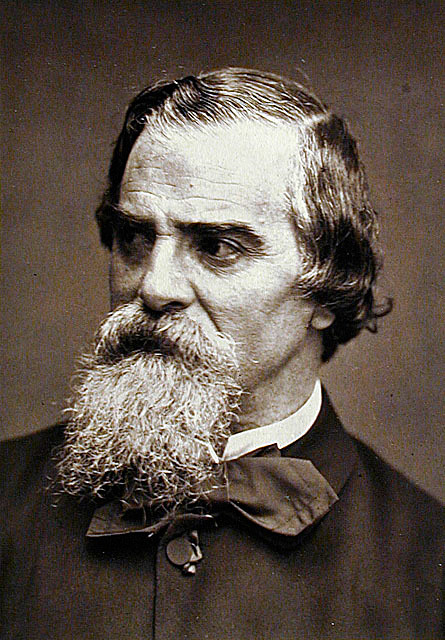
- Narcisse Virgilio Díaz (Woodburytype), c.1876
- Born: 20 August 1807; Bordeaux
- Died: 18 November 1876 (aged 69); Menton, France
- Education: Sèvres Studio
- Movement: Barbizon school; Orientalist

Narcisse Virgilio Díaz de la Peña (20 August 1807 – 18 November 1876) was a French painter of the Barbizon school.

== Early life ==
Diaz was born in Bordeaux to Spanish parents. At the age of ten, Diaz became an orphan, and misfortune dogged his early years. His foot was bitten by a reptile in Meudon wood, near Sèvres, where he had been taken to live with some friends of his mother. The bite was poorly dressed, and ultimately he lost his leg. However, as it turned out, the wooden stump that replaced his leg became famous.

At fifteen he entered the studios at Sèvres, first working on the decoration of porcelain and later turning to painting. Turkish and Oriental scenes attracted him, and he took to painting Eastern figures dressed in richly coloured garments; many of these paintings remain extant. He also spent much time at Barbizon, near the Fontainebleau Forest, where some of his most famous paintings were made. One of his teachers and friends in Paris was François Souchon.

Around 1831 Díaz encountered Théodore Rousseau, for whom he possessed a great veneration, despite the fact that Rousseau was four years younger. At Fontainebleau Díaz found Rousseau painting his wonderful forest pictures, and was determined to paint in the same way if possible. However, Rousseau was then in poor health, embittered against the world, and consequently was difficult to approach. On one occasion, Diaz followed him surreptitiously to the forest, with his wooden leg hindering his advance, but he dodged around after the painter, trying to observe his method of work. After a time Díaz found a way to become friendly with Rousseau, and revealed his eagerness to understand the latter's techniques. Rousseau was touched with the passionate words of admiration, and finally taught Diaz all he knew.

Díaz exhibited many pictures at the Paris Salon, and was decorated in 1851 with the rank of Chevalier (Knight) of the Légion d’honneur. During the Franco-German War (1870–71) he went to Brussels. After 1871, his works became fashionable and rose gradually in the estimation of collectors, and he worked constantly and successfully. Díaz's finest pictures are his forest scenes and storms, and it is on these that his fame rests. There are several examples of his work in the Louvre, and three small figure pictures in the Wallace Collection, Hertford House. Perhaps the most notable of Diaz's works are The Pearl Fairy (1857); Sunset in the Forest (1868); The Forest of Fontainebleau (1870), and The Storm (1871). The Metropolitan Museum of Art holds some two dozen works by Díaz, including another version of The Forest of Fontainebleau and many drawings and studies.

Diaz himself had no well-known pupils, but François Visconti emulated his work to some degree and Léon Richet followed markedly his methods of tree-painting. For a period, Jean-François Millet also painted small figures in avowed imitation of Diaz's then popular subjects. Renoir once said "my hero was Díaz". In 1876, while visiting his son's grave, he caught a cold. He went to Menton in an attempt to recover his health, but on 18 November that year he died.

Díaz's son, Eugène-Émile (1837–1901), achieved some fame as composer Eugène Diaz.

The rue Narcisse Diaz in Auteuil, Paris is named after him.

== Gallery ==
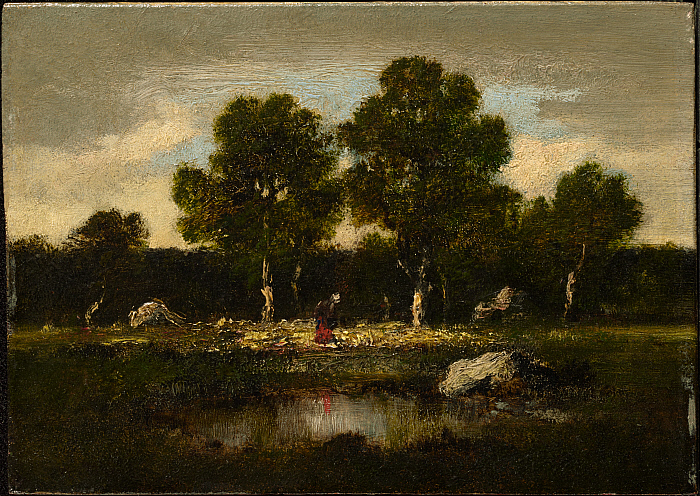
Trees near Barbizon (1855–76), oil on panel, 5 1/8 x 7 3/16 in. (13 x 18.3 cm), Clark Art Institute

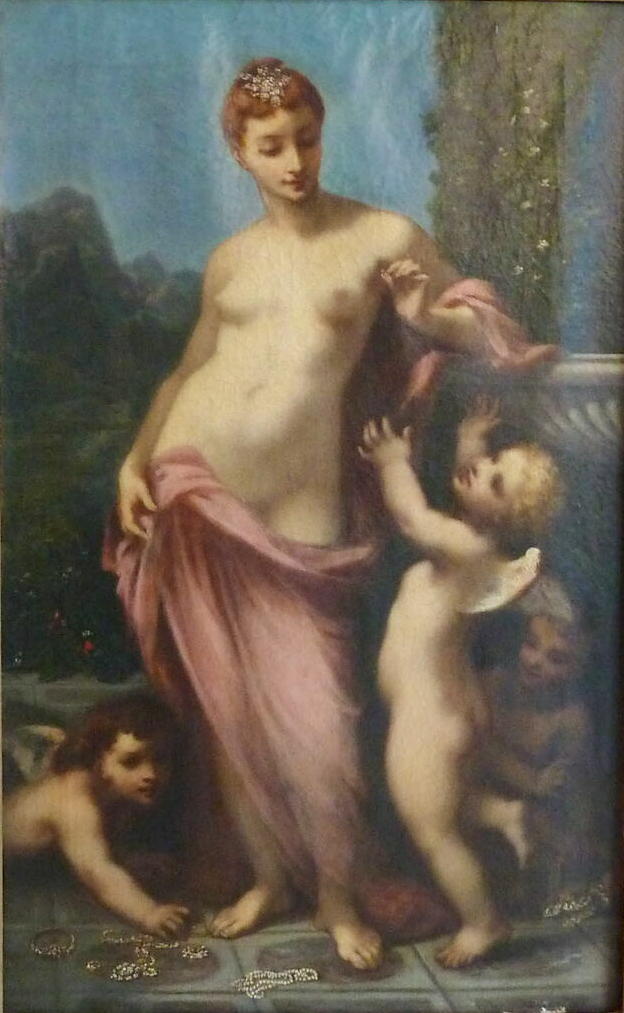
The Pearl Fairy (1857)

The Edge of the Forest at Les Monts-Girard, Fontainebleau (1868)

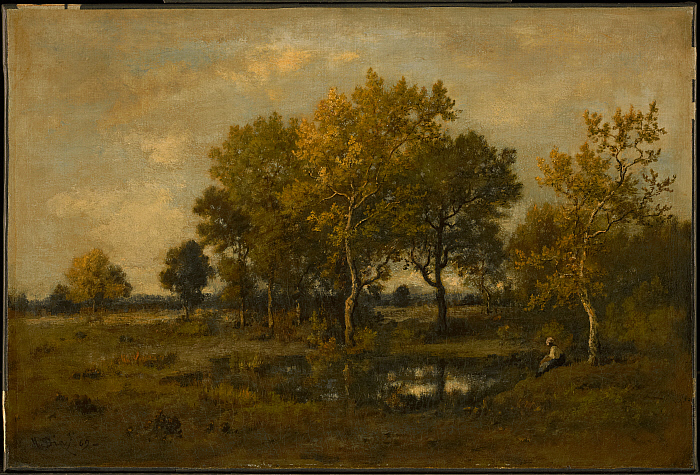
Forest Clearing (1869), oil on canvas, 14 15/16 x 21 15/16 in. (37.9 x 55.7 cm), Clark Art Institute

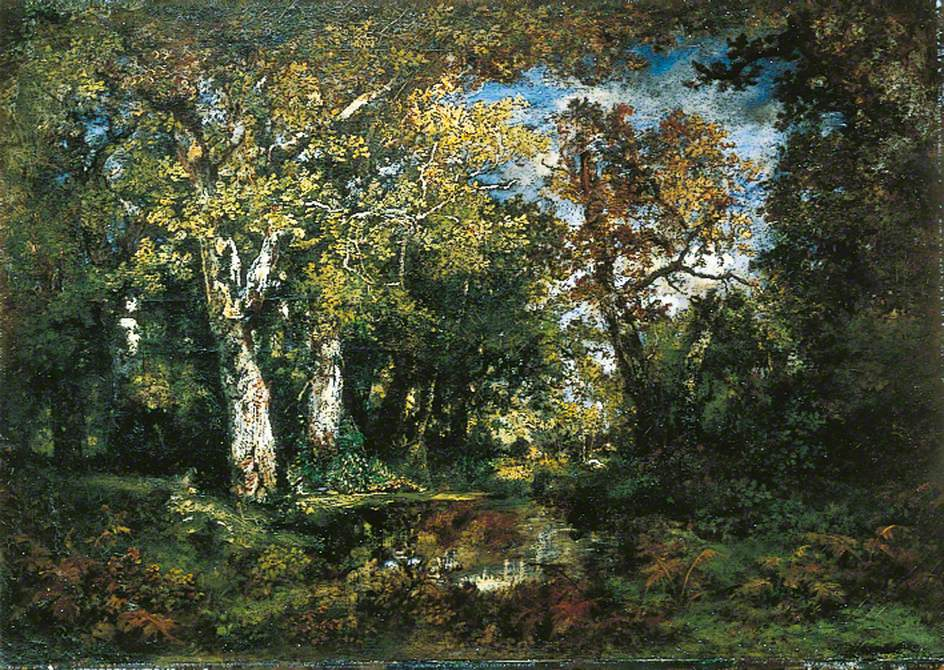
Forest of Fontainebleau (1870)

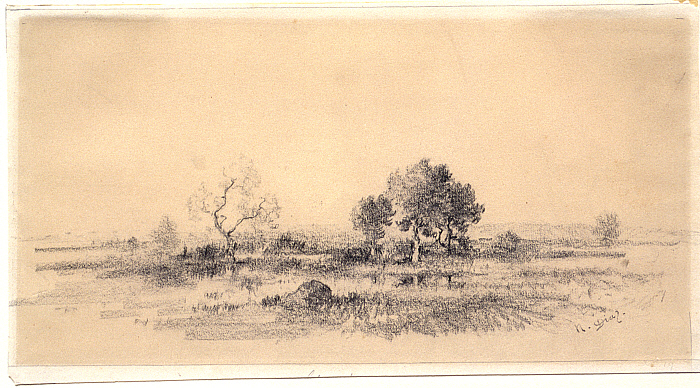
Landscape (1870–72), black chalk on buff paper, 6 x 11 in. (15.2 x 28 cm), Clark Art Institute

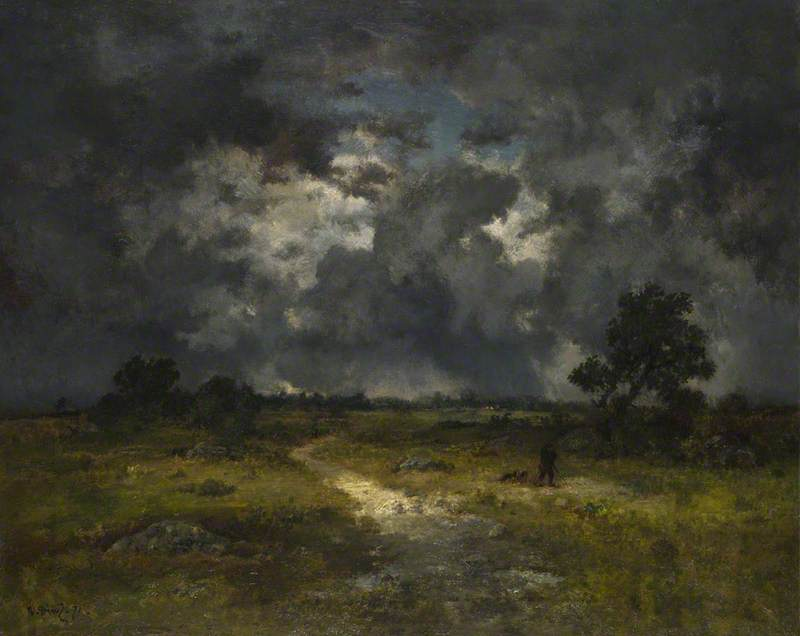
The Storm (1871)

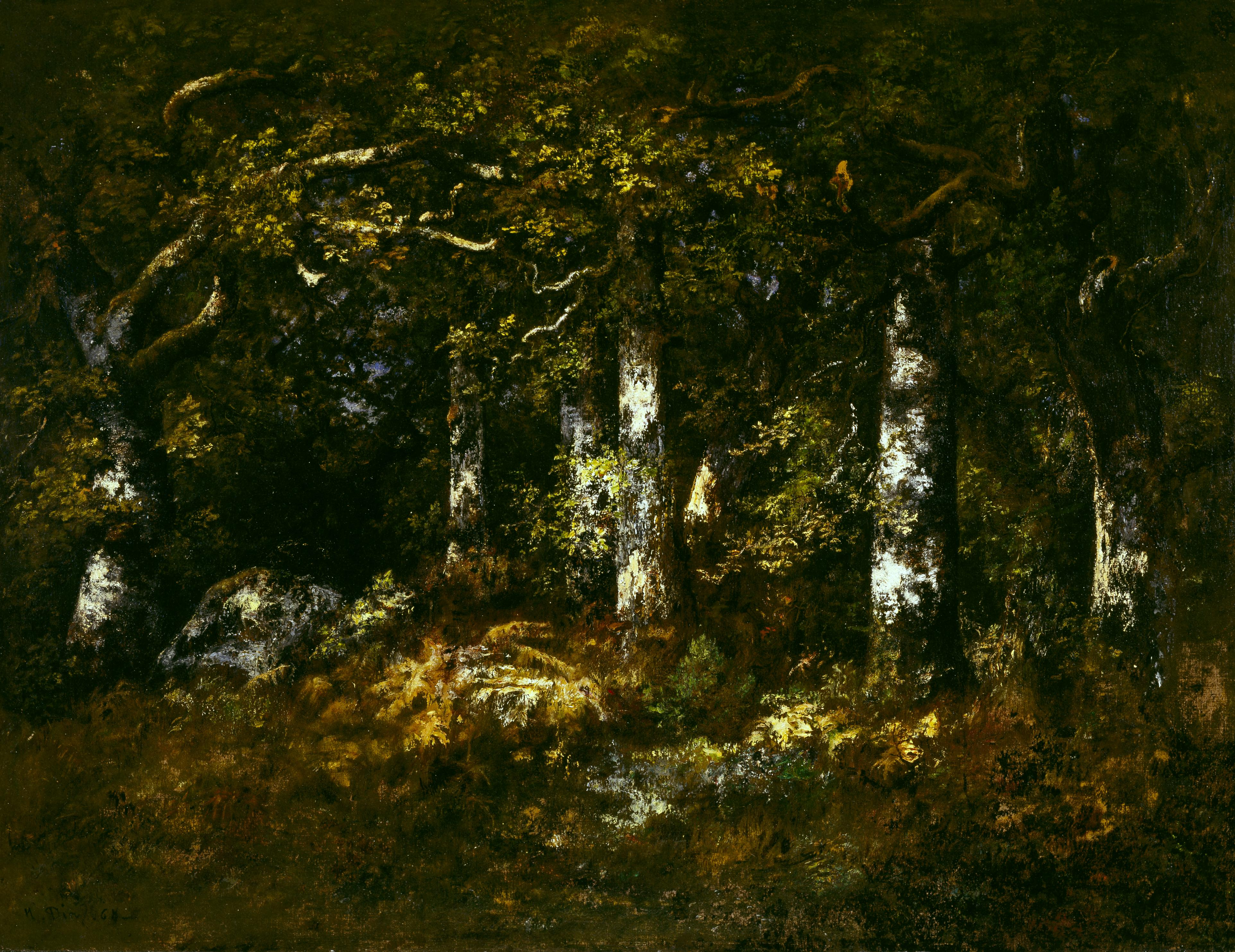
Forest of Fontainebleau (1868), in the Dallas Museum of Art

The Forest Clearing (1875)
