= Abel de Pujol =

French painter (1785–1861)

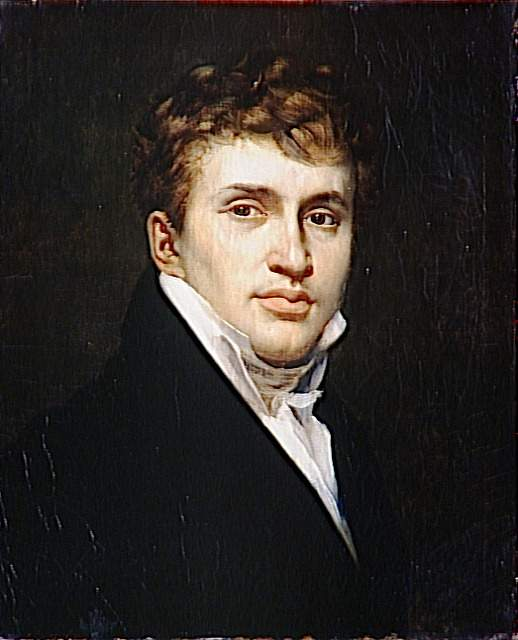
- Self-portrait, 1812
- Born: Alexandre-Denis-Abel de Pujol; 30 January 1785; Valenciennes, France
- Died: 29 September 1861 (aged 76); Paris, France
- Known for: Painting
- Notable work: Ceiling of the grand-staircase at the Louvre, galerie de Diane at Fontainebleau, ceiling of the Bourse de Paris
- Spouse: Adrienne Marie Louise Grandpierre-Deverzy (m. 1856)
- Awards: Officer of the légion d'honneur

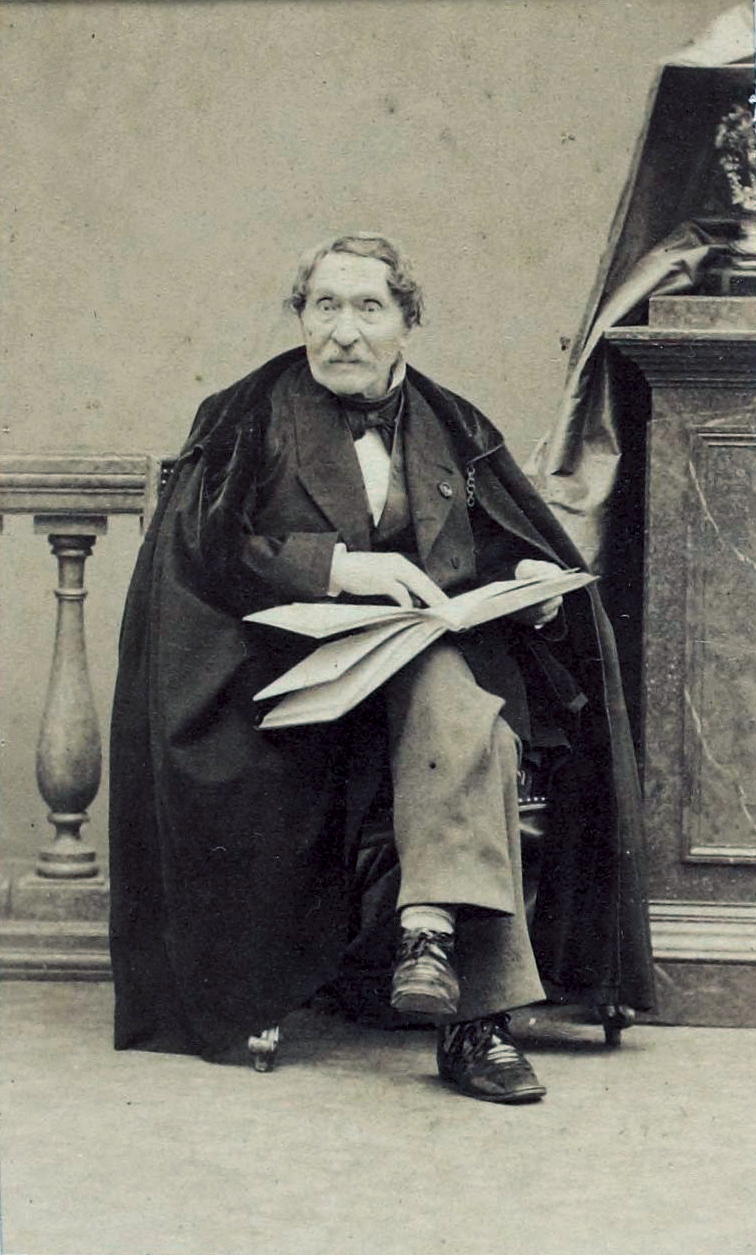
Abel de Pujol, ca.1860. Photograph by André-Adolphe-Eugène Disdéri

Alexandre-Denis-Abel de Pujol or Abel de Pujol (30 January 1785 in Valenciennes – 29 September 1861 in Paris) was a French painter. He was a student of David and his own students included Alexandre-Gabriel Decamps and Émile Lévy. He painted the ceiling of the grand-staircase at the Louvre as well as the galerie de Diane at Fontainebleau and the ceiling of the Bourse de Paris. A member of the Institut de France, he was an officer of the légion d'honneur.

== Selected works ==
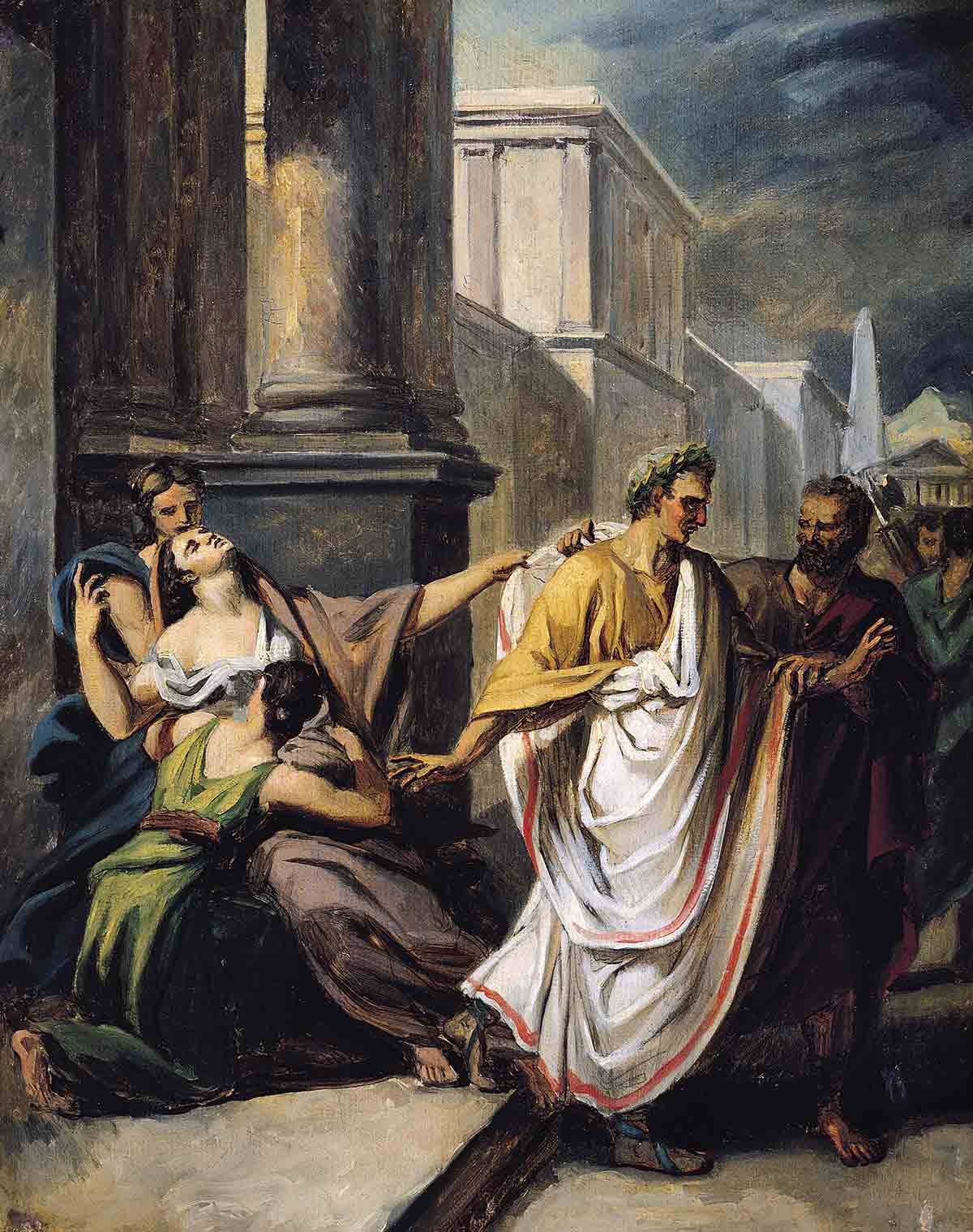
Caesar going to the Senate on the Ides of March

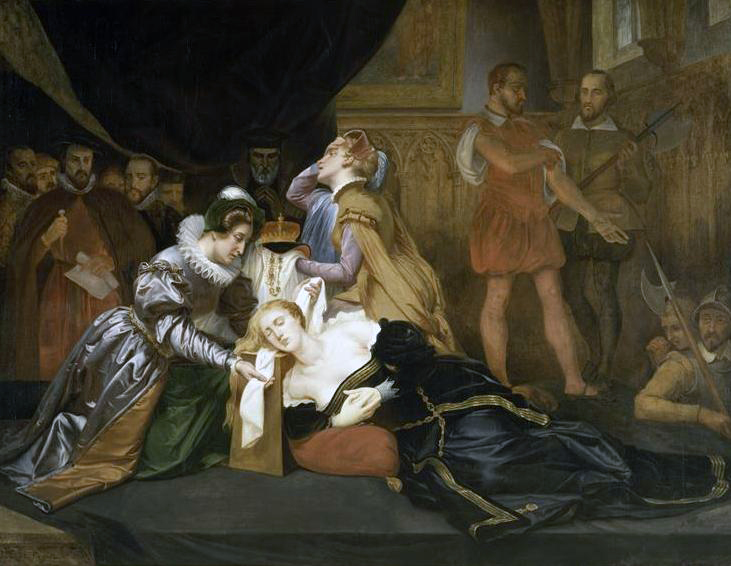
The Execution of
Mary Queen of Scots

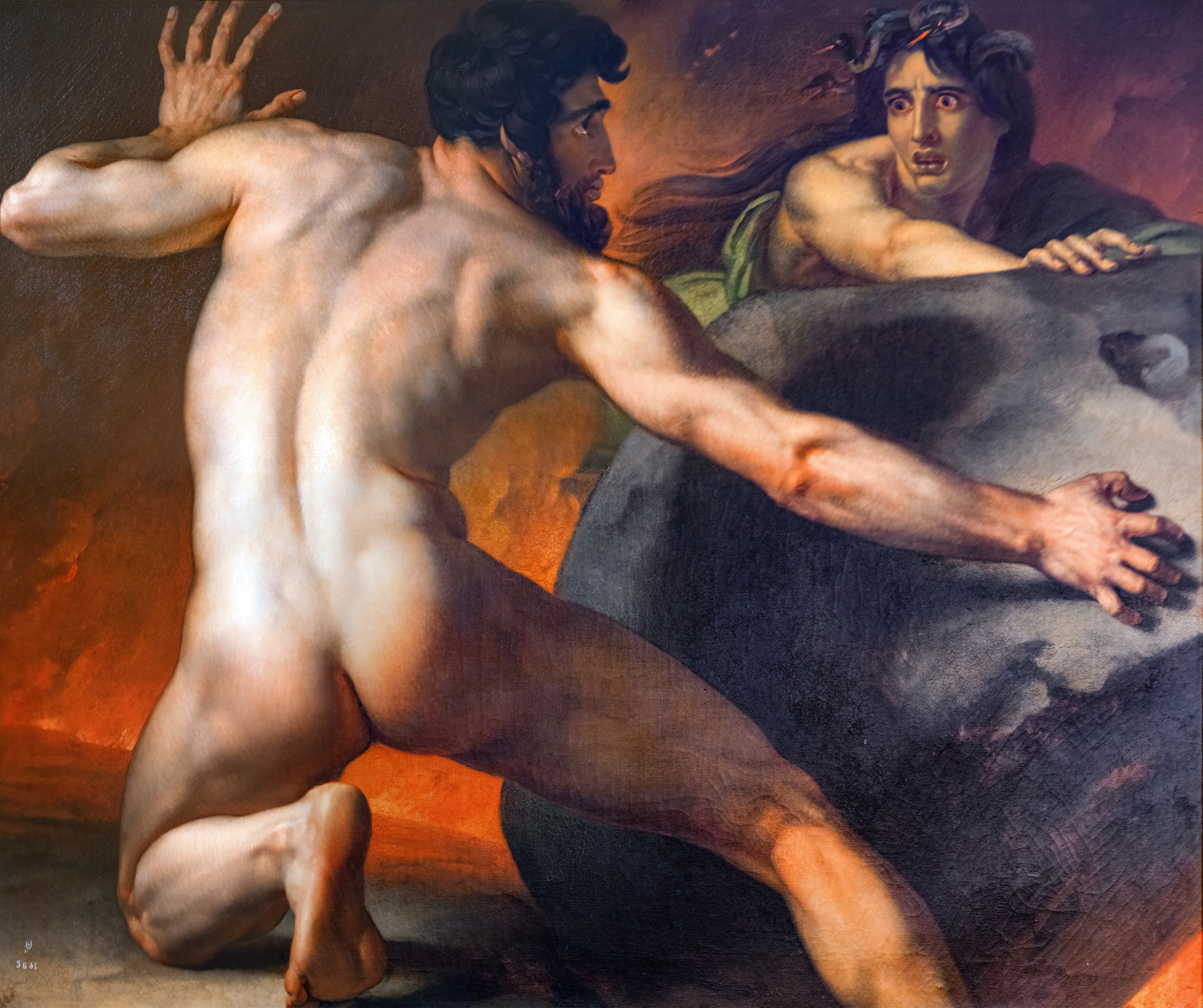
Sisyphus eternally rolls his rock

== Students ==
- Julien Hudson, (1811–1844)
- François Debon, (1816–1872)
- Adrienne Marie Louise Grandpierre-Deverzy, (1798–1869) who married him
- Auguste Désiré Saint-Quentin, (1833–1906)
- Alexandre-Gabriel Decamps, (1803–1860)
- Alphonse Lami, (1822-1867)

== Bibliography ==
- Théodore Pelloquet Dictionnaire de poche des artistes contemporains Paris 1858
- Georges Rouget Notice sur Abel de Pujol, peintre d'histoire, membre de l'Institut typ. de E. Prignet Paris 1861 on Googlebooks
