= Hubert Cailleau =

French painter (c. 1526 – 1590)

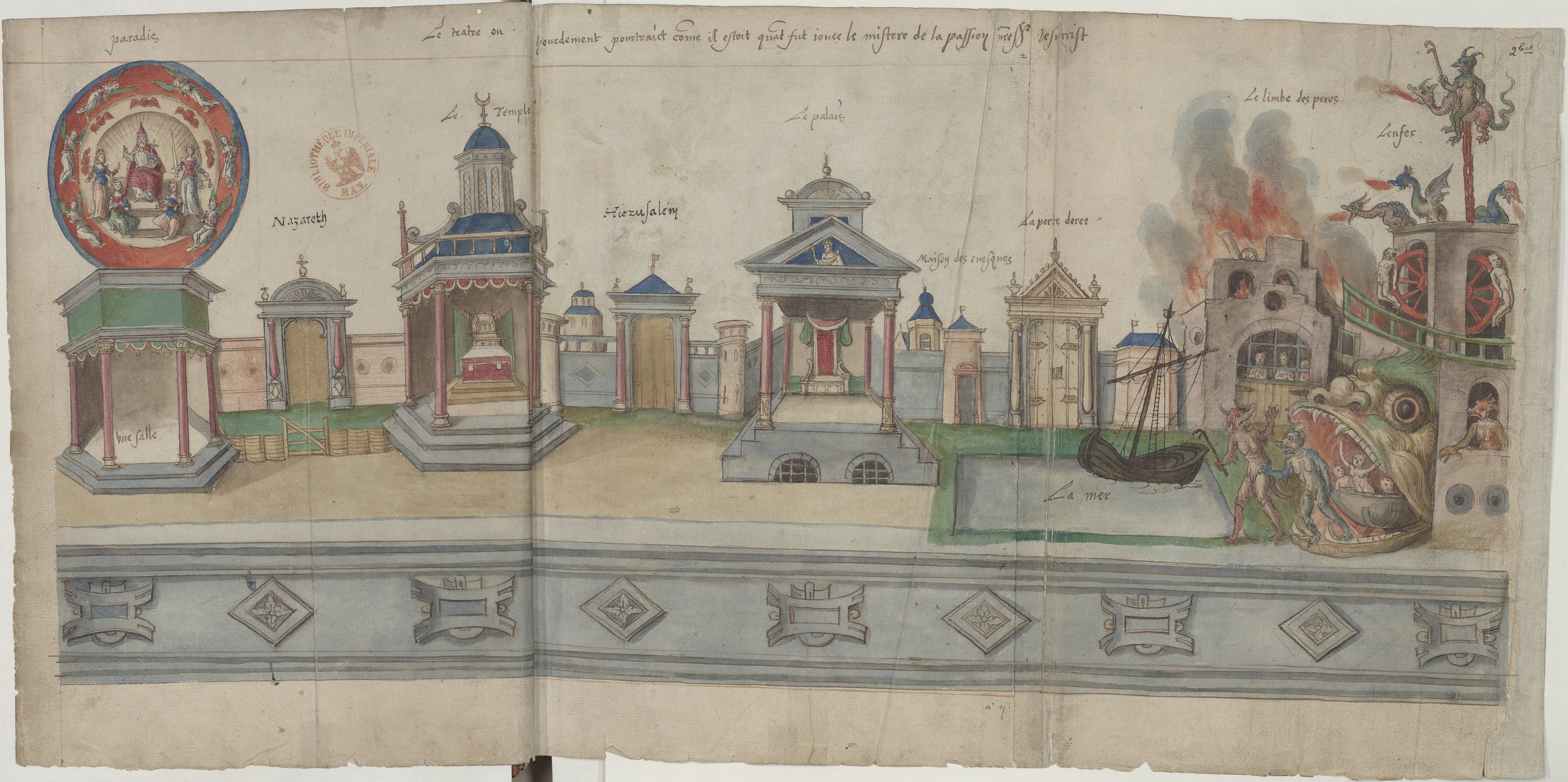
Stage Design for The Passion and Resurrection of the Savior

Hubert Cailleau (c. 1526 – 1590), was a French historical and miniature painter and stage designer, who flourished at Valenciennes. There are some clever designs made by him, that now reside in the National Library at Paris, which were done for a mystery of the Passion acted at Valenciennes in 1547. He is famous for the illustrations of these sets, especially the frontispiece to The Passion and Resurrection of the Savior (1577), which are the most detailed surviving examples of such staging.

== Bibliography ==
- Vince, Ronald W. A Companion to the Medieval Theatre. Greenwood Press, 1989.
