= Marcel Pinte =

French Resistance member

- Born: 12 April 1938; Valenciennes
- Died: 19 August 1944 (aged 6)
- Known for: Member of the French Resistance
- Father: Eugène Pinte

Marcel Pinte (12 April 1938 – 19 August 1944) was a member of the French Resistance opposing the Nazi occupation of France during World War II. He was notable for his youth, dying at age six, and is regarded as France's youngest resistance hero.

== Life ==
Pinte was born in Valenciennes in April 1938, the youngest of five children. His father, Eugène Pinte, was a local resistance leader who used his farmhouse in Aixe-sur-Vienne to receive coded messages from London and coordinate parachute drops in a field nearby.

From a young age Marcel acted as a courier for local resistance fighters. He was given the nickname "Quinquin" after a children's song.

He was killed, aged six, on 19 August 1944 when he was hit by several bullets from an unintentional discharge by a Sten gun shortly after a large group of resistance fighters had landed by parachute.

Pinte was buried by local resistance fighters on 21 August shortly before the liberation of Limoges, in which his father participated. According to a relative, Marc Pinte, the next supply drop, a few days after Marcel's death, used black parachutes: "The British knew that the little Marcel played a real role. This parachute was the calling card sent to the family".

== Posthumous honours ==
In 1950, he was awarded the posthumous rank of Sergeant in the Resistance. In August 2013, the National Office of Former Combatants and War Victims delivered a card for "volunteer combatants of the Resistance" in the name of "Monsieur Marcel Pinte". On Armistice Day 2020, Pinte was honoured in a special ceremony in which his name was inscribed on the war memorial of Aixe-sur-Vienne near Limoges.
