= François Visconti =

French painter

François Visconti was a 19th-century French painter of the Barbizon school. Visconti was active, from at least the early 1870s, in the Fontainebleau region of France. While not as well known as many of his contemporaries, his works were accepted at exhibitions alongside the likes of Jean-Baptiste-Camille Corot, Charles-François Daubigny, and Narcisse Virgilio Díaz among others.

Since his death Visconti's works have continued to be collectible, resulting in a regular stream of successful auction transactions, including Christie’s (New York, 2000), Bernaerts (Antwerp, 2008), and Bruun Rasmussen (Denmark, 2007), among others.
