= Fabrice Jaumont =

French educator

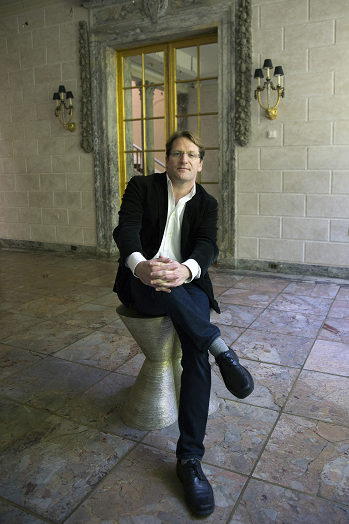
- Fabrice Jaumont
- Born: Valenciennes, France
- Education: PhD in International Education
- Alma mater: New York University
- Occupation: Educator
- Years active: 1997–present
- Awards: The James W. Dodge Foreign Language Advocate Award
- Honours: Ordre des Palmes académiques
- Website: www.fabricejaumont.net

Fabrice Jaumont is a French-American educator, author, and advocate for bilingual education. He is known for his work promoting dual-language and language immersion programs internationally.

== Education and career ==
Born in Valenciennes, France, Jaumont moved to the United States in 1997 and later served as education attaché for the Embassy of France to the United States. He received a PhD in International Education from New York University, where his research focused on philanthropy and higher education in Africa. He has been affiliated with the Fondation Maison des Sciences de l'Homme (FMSH) in Paris and the Network for International Policies and Cooperation in Education and Training (NORRAG) in Geneva, where he contributed to research and editorial work on philanthropy in education. In 2018, Jaumont founded the Center for the Advancement of Languages, Education, and Communities (CALEC), a New York-based nonprofit publishing organization focused on multilingualism, cross-cultural understanding, and linguistic communities. That same year, he began hosting Révolution bilingue, a podcast produced with the French-language news outlet French Morning, featuring interviews on bilingualism with researchers and practitioners. He has spoken at conferences in the United States and internationally on topics related to multilingualism and linguistic diversity.

== The Bilingual Revolution ==
In 2005, French parents and educators in New York initiated efforts to expand French dual-language programs in public schools. Their grassroots approach, later described as the "bilingual revolution," involved organizing families and community stakeholders in neighborhoods, including Brooklyn, Harlem, and the Bronx. The model was subsequently adopted by other linguistic communities in New York City and elsewhere, contributing to the development of dual-language and immersion programs in multiple languages, including French, Italian, German, Russian, Japanese, Chinese, Polish, Spanish, and Arabic. In 2014, The New York Times referred to Jaumont as the "Godfather of language immersion programs" in recognition of his involvement in the expansion of such initiatives. The same year, Les Echos included him in a list of influential French figures for his role in promoting bilingual education.

Jaumont is the author of The Bilingual Revolution: The Future of Education is in Two Languages (2017). The book has been translated into multiple languages and has been cited in discussions of bilingual education as a global asset, a form of social innovation, and an approach to addressing discrimination and inequality while supporting heritage languages.

== Works ==
- Bridging Worlds: The Power of Heritage Languages in Social Cohesion (TBR Books, 2026)
- French all around us: Exploring the Legacy and Future of Francophonie in the United States (Vol. 2, TBR Books, 2025)
- Speaking the World: Multilingualism and Cultural Fluency in the Professional World (TBR Books, 2024)
- Mosaic of Tongues: Multilingual Learning for the Arabic-speaking World (TBR Books, 2024)
- A Bilingual Revolution for Africa (TBR Books, 2023)
- Conversations on Bilingualism (TBR Books, 2022)
- French All Around Us: French Language and Francophone Culture in the United States (Vol. 1, TBR Books, 2022).
- الثورة ثنائية اللغة (Austin Macauley, 2019)
- The Gift of Languages: Paradigm Shift in Foreign Language Education (TBR Books, 2019)
- Stanley Kubrick: The Odysseys (Book Case Engine, 2018)
- Partenaires inégaux: fondations américaines et universités en Afrique (Editions Maison des sciences de l’homme, 2018)
- The Bilingual Revolution: The Future of Education is in Two Languages (TBR Books, 2017)
- Unequal Partners: American Foundations and Higher Education Development in Africa (Palgrave - Macmillan, 2016)

== Honors & Awards ==
- Médaille d’Or de Solidarité et Valeur, La Renaissance Française (2024)
- The James W. Dodge Foreign Language Advocate, NECTFL (2020)
- New York Bilingual Fair Leader Award, French Morning (2019)
- Knight of the Ordre des Palmes académiques (2012)
- Medal of Recognition, Committee of French-speaking Societies of the United States (2015)
- Cultural Diversity Award, Organisation internationale de la Francophonie and Committee of French-speaking Ambassadors to the United Nations (2016).
