= Christian Nau =

French land sailor (1944–2022)

- Born: 27 September 1944; Valenciennes, France
- Died: 5 February 2022 (aged 77); Le Touquet, France
- Occupations: Land sailor Writer

Christian Nau (27 September 1944 – 5 February 2022) was a French land sailor and writer. He was a seven-time medalist at the European Land Sailing Championships.

== Biography ==
Passionate about sailing, Nau crossed the North Atlantic in 1983. He continued his expeditions on land by tricycle, sail bogey, and land sailing. He wrote several books chronicling his adventures. Nau died in Le Touquet on 5 February 2022, at the age of 77.

== Awards ==
- Bronze Medal at the European Land Sailing Championships (Sankt Peter-Ording, 1963)
- Bronze Medal at the European Land Sailing Championships (De Panne, 1964)
- Silver Medal at the European Land Sailing Championships (Le Touquet, 1965)
- Gold Medal at the European Land Sailing Championships (Lytham St Annes, 1966)
- Silver Medal at the European Land Sailing Championships (Cherrueix, 1969)
- Bronze Medal at the European Land Sailing Championships (Oostduinkerke, 1972)
- Silver Medal at the European Land Sailing Championships (Berck, 1973)

== Publications ==
- Le Désert en char à voile : du Sahara aux îles Kerguelen (1980)
- La Voile : du Sahara au Grœnland (1983)
- Voiliers des glaces : aux bons soins d'Éole... : Mauritanie, îles Kerguelen, traversée de l'Atlantique Nord vers la banquise, Gröenland, Réunion (1999)
- Voiliers des sables : aux bons soins d'Éole : îles Kerguelen, Chine ancienne, Égypte ancienne, Sahara espagnol, Algérie, Sénégal, Réunion, Mauritanie (1999)
- Voiliers du rail : ux bons soins d'Éole : Death valley, Île de la Réunion, Île Maurice, Mauritanie, Bolivie, Botswana, Sibérie arctique, Chine, Îles Falkland (1999)
- Dictionnaire des îles (2002)
- Ils ont, on a, donné leurs noms (2005)
- Le Touquet-Paris-Plage de A à Z (2008)
- Encyclopédie des tours du monde : sur mer, sur terre et dans les airs (2012)
- Tours du monde : en mer, sur terre, dans les airs et dans l'espace (2017)
- Dictionnaire des éponymes mondiaux : 10000 références commentées (2018)
