= François Debon =

French painter (1807–1872)

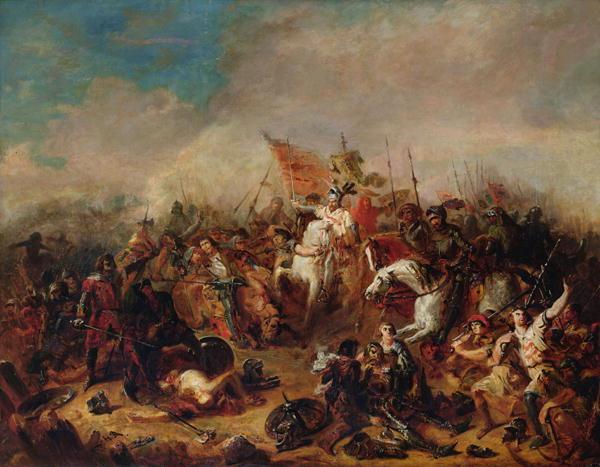
François Debon, The Battle of Hastings in 1066, Musee des Beaux-Arts, Caen, France

François Hyppolite Debon (2 December 1807, Paris – 29 February 1872, Paris), was a French painter. He studied under Antoine-Jean Gros and Abel de Pujol, and exhibited at the Paris Salon, where he won several medals, including a third class one in 1844 and two second class ones in 1835 and 1868. Baudelaire said of Debon's 1845 painting The Battle of Hastings "What talent! What energy!" That canvas was later lost in a fire at the musée des Beaux-Arts de Caen in 1905.

== Biography ==
- Philippe Auquier, Catalog of paintings, sculptures, pastels and drawings, Barlatier, 1908, p. 81.

== Works ==
- Un justicier (Self-portrait), 1835, Musée de la Vie romantique, Hôtel Scheffer-Renan, Paris;
- La Bataille d'Hastings, 1845, musée des beaux-arts, Caen;
- Défaite d'Attila dans les plaines de Châlons, 1848, Musée des beaux-arts de Marseille;
- L'Entrée de Guillaume le conquérant à Londres, 1856, destroyed;
- Portrait de Monsieur Guillard, lost;
- Portrait en pied de Guillaume le conquérant, 1843, destroyed.
