= Auguste Désiré Saint-Quentin =

French painter (1838–1906)

Auguste Désiré Saint-Quentin (1838 in Valenciennes – 1906) was a French painter. Studying under Abel de Pujol, he painted the ceiling of the église Saint-Géry at Valenciennes and paintings for the église Saint-Martin at Sebourg in the Valenciennois, as well as working on the casket of Saint Drogo (also at the église Saint-Martin). The Musée des Beaux Arts de Tourcoing has a watercolour by him.
