= Léon Richet =

French painter (1847–1907)

Léon Richet (15 April 1843 – 28 March 1907) was a French landscape painter. He was born in Solesmes, Nord. He studied art in Valenciennes and became a high school teacher there in 1879. He became associated with the Barbizon school and did several paintings with Narcisse Virgilio Díaz. His artwork was exhibited at the Société des Artistes Français from 1880 to 1906.

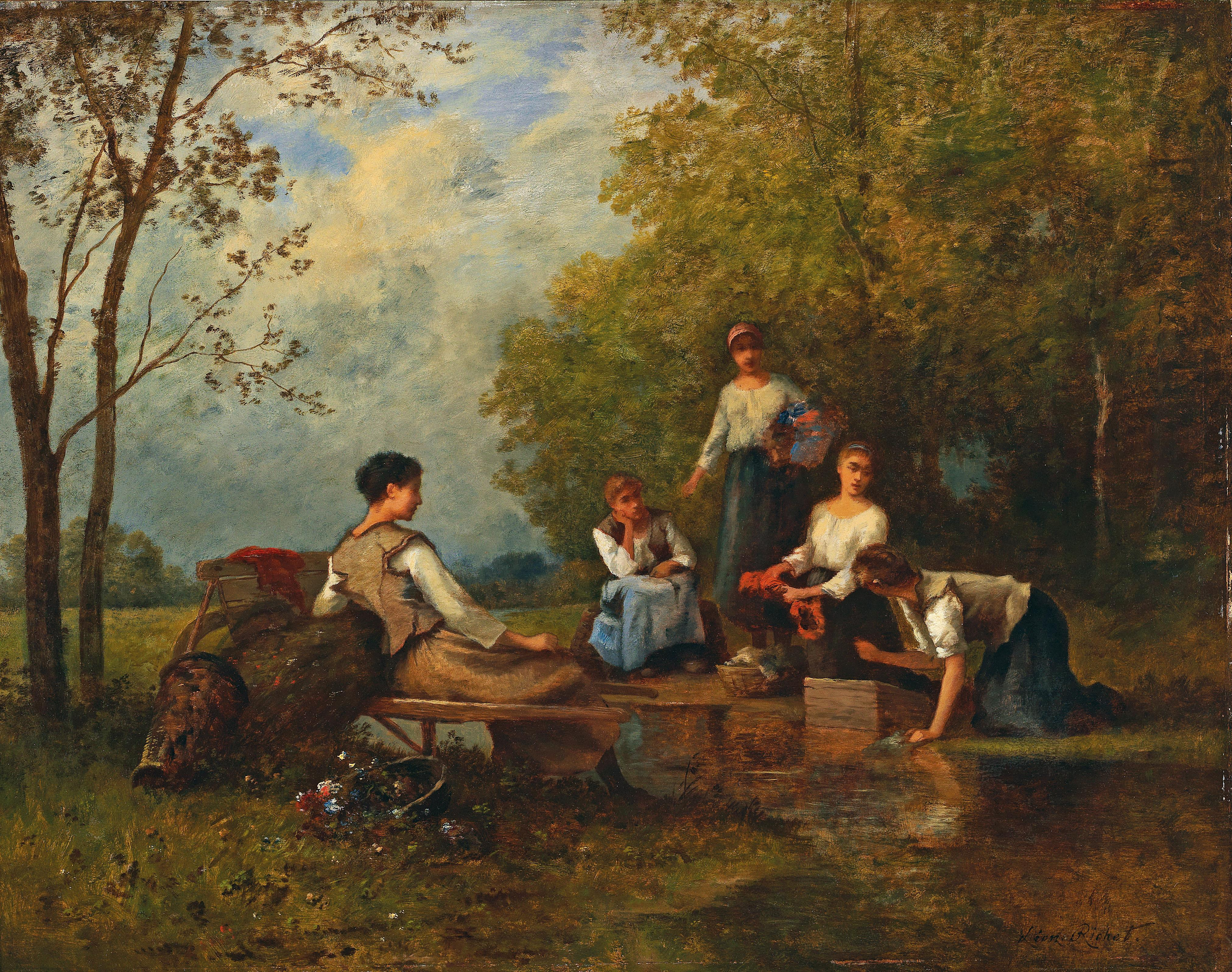
Léon Richet painting.
