= Valenciennes =

Commune in Hauts-de-France, France

Valenciennes Valincyinnes / Valinciennes (Picard)
- Subprefecture and commune
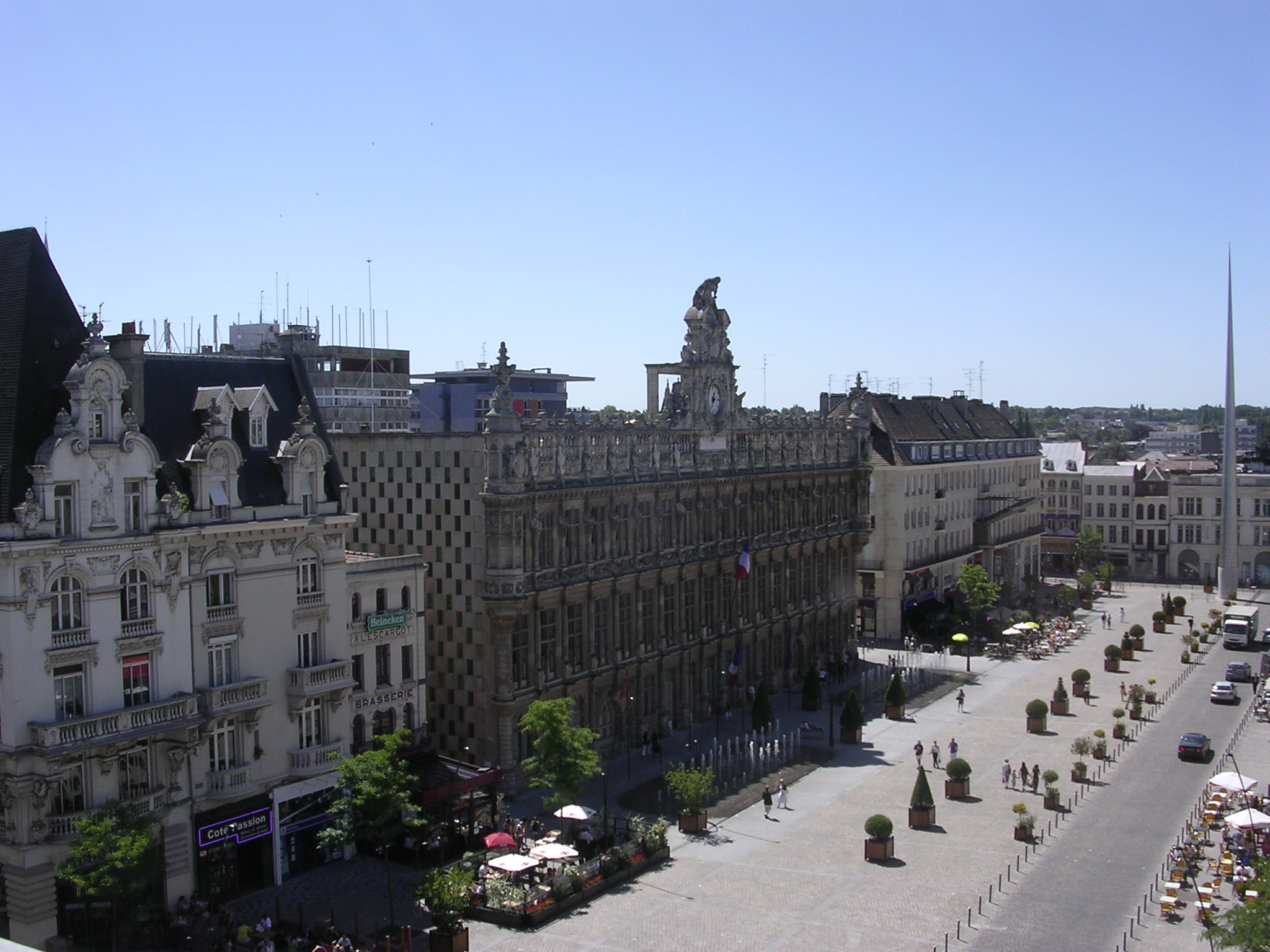
- The Hôtel de Ville (City Hall)

- Coat of arms
- Location of Valenciennes
- Location within France Location within Hauts-de-France
- Coordinates: 50°21′29″N 03°31′24″E
- Country: France
- Region: Hauts-de-France
- Department: Nord
- Arrondissement: Valenciennes
- Canton: Valenciennes
- Intercommunality: CA Valenciennes Métropole

Government
  - Mayor (2020–2026): Laurent Degallaix (UDI)
- Area^{1}: 13.82 km^{2} (5.34 sq mi)
- Elevation: 42 m (138 ft)
- Highest elevation: 56 m (184 ft)
- Lowest elevation: 17 m (56 ft)
- Population (2023): 43,468
  - Density: 3,145/km^{2} (8,146/sq mi)
- Demonym(s): Valenciennois (masculine); Valenciennoise (feminine)
- Time zone: UTC+01:00 (CET)
  - Summer (DST): UTC+02:00 (CEST)
- INSEE/Postal code: 59606 /59300
- ^{1} French Land Register data, which excludes lakes, ponds, glaciers > 1 km^{2} (0.386 sq mi or 247 acres) and river estuaries.

Valenciennes (/ˌvælɒ̃ˈsjɛn/, also UK: /ˌvælənsiˈɛn/, US: /-nz, vəˌlɛnsiˈɛn(z)/, French: [valɑ̃sjɛn]; also Dutch: Valencijn; Picard: Valincyinnes or Valinciennes; Latin: Valentianae) is a commune in the Nord department, Hauts-de-France, France.

It lies on the Scheldt (French: Escaut) river. Although the city and region experienced a steady population decline between 1975 and 1990, it has since rebounded.

== History ==
=== Early history ===
In 923, it passed to the Duchy of Lower Lotharingia dependent on the Holy Roman Empire. Once the Empire of the Franks was established, the city began to develop, though the archaeological record has still not revealed all it has to reveal about this period.

In 1259, Valenciennes was the site of a General Chapter of the Dominican Order at which Thomas Aquinas together with masters Bonushomo Britto, Florentius, Albert, and Peter took part in establishing a ratio studiorum or program of studies for the Dominican Order that featured the study of philosophy as an innovation for those not sufficiently trained to study theology. This innovation initiated the tradition of Dominican scholastic philosophy put into practice, for example, in 1265 at the Order's studium provinciale at the convent of Santa Sabina in Rome, out of which would develop the Pontifical University of Saint Thomas Aquinas, Angelicum.

=== 1500–1793 ===
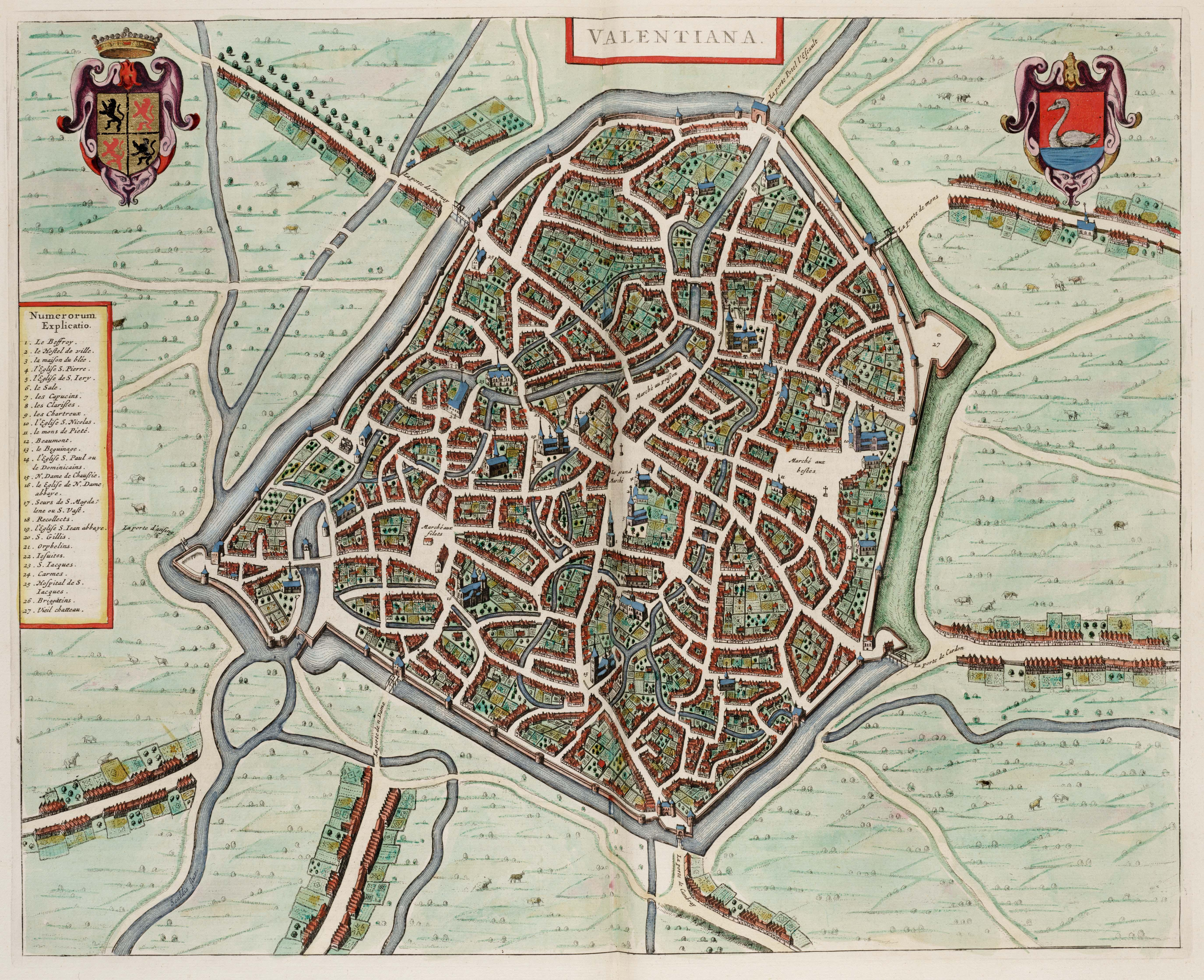
Valenciennes in the 17th century

In 1524, Charles V, Holy Roman Emperor, arrived at Valenciennes, and – even when Henry II of France allied with him against the Protestants in 1552 – Valenciennes became (c. 1560) an early center of Calvinism and in 1562 was location of the first act of resistance against persecution of Protestants in the Spanish Netherlands. On the "Journée des Mals Brûlés" (Bad Burnings Day) in 1562, a mob freed some Protestants condemned to die at the stake. In the wave of iconoclastic attacks called the Beeldenstorm that swept the Habsburg Netherlands in the summer of 1566, the city was the furthest south to see such an attack on August 24, 1566. It was also one of the first to feel the hand of repression after the siege and fall of the city on March 23, 1567. One of the victims of that repression was Guido de Bres, the author of the Belgic Confession. Following the Dutch rebels' victory at Brielle, the army of Louis of Nassau, one of the major commanders of the rebel forces, supported by the Huguenot leader Gaspard II de Coligny, invaded the Spanish Netherlands with an army composed of German, English, Scottish and French soldiers, and took Valenciennes on 21 May 1572. However, Louis went on to Mons, and the Protestant garrison left behind offered only a feeble defence to the Duke of Alba, at the head of the bulk of the Spanish army, who recaptured Valenciennes in early June 1572, depriving Louis's French allies of one of their main bases.

The French army laid siege to the city in 1656 (Vauban participated in this siege without a command). Defending the city, Albert de Merode, marquis de Trélon was injured during a sortie on horseback, died as a result of his injuries and was buried in the Church of St. Paul (his tomb was found during the archaeological campaign in 1990).

In 1677, the armies of Louis XIV (this time led by Vauban) captured the city and in 1678 the Treaty of Nijmegen gave the French control of Valenciennes (1678) and the surrounding southern part of Hainault, roughly cutting the former county in half.

=== 1793–1914 ===
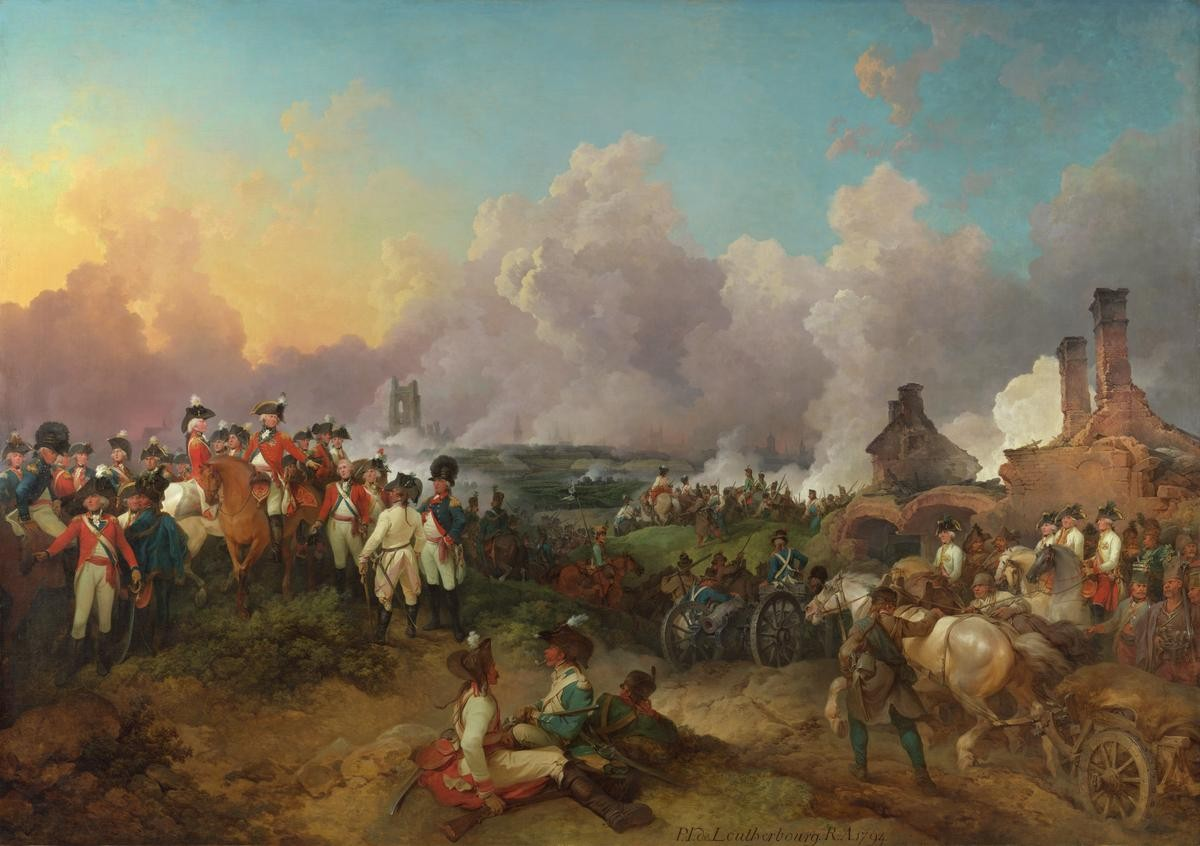
The Grand Attack on Valenciennes by Philip James de Loutherbourg, 1794

The city was besieged by the First Coalition against Revolutionary France in 1793.

=== First World War ===
During World War I the German army occupied the town in 1914. They were finally driven out by British forces at the Battle of Valenciennes in 1918, 'in which seven British divisions attacked eleven German divisions'. One dramatic first-hand experience of this battle is provided by A. S. Bullock who fought at a section of the front near Maresches.

=== 1945 to present ===
The town's first antenna was set up in Lille in 1964, then the Centre universitaire was set up in 1970, becoming independent in 1979 as the University of Valenciennes and Hainaut-Cambrésis.

In 2005, a local resident, Isabelle Dinoire, became the first person to have a partial face transplant.

== Geography ==
=== Climate ===
Valenciennes has an oceanic climate (Köppen climate classification Cfb). The average annual temperature in Valenciennes is 11.0 °C (51.8 °F). The average annual rainfall is 694.1 mm (27.33 in) with December as the wettest month. The temperatures are highest on average in July, at around 18.7 °C (65.7 °F), and lowest in January, at around 3.9 °C (39.0 °F). The highest temperature ever recorded in Valenciennes was 40.9 °C (105.6 °F) on 25 July 2019; the coldest temperature ever recorded was −14.9 °C (5.2 °F) on 7 January 2009.

Climate data for Valenciennes (1991−2020 normals, extremes 1987−present)
Month	Jan	Feb	Mar	Apr	May	Jun	Jul	Aug	Sep	Oct	Nov	Dec	Year
Record high °C (°F)	15.3 (59.5)	19.2 (66.6)	23.9 (75.0)	28.0 (82.4)	31.2 (88.2)	35.0 (95.0)	40.9 (105.6)	37.2 (99.0)	34.8 (94.6)	28.6 (83.5)	21.8 (71.2)	16.0 (60.8)	40.9 (105.6)
Mean daily maximum °C (°F)	6.4 (43.5)	7.6 (45.7)	11.4 (52.5)	15.1 (59.2)	18.8 (65.8)	21.9 (71.4)	24.0 (75.2)	24.0 (75.2)	20.4 (68.7)	15.5 (59.9)	10.2 (50.4)	6.9 (44.4)	15.2 (59.4)
Daily mean °C (°F)	3.9 (39.0)	4.5 (40.1)	7.4 (45.3)	10.1 (50.2)	13.6 (56.5)	16.6 (61.9)	18.7 (65.7)	18.6 (65.5)	15.5 (59.9)	11.7 (53.1)	7.3 (45.1)	4.5 (40.1)	11.0 (51.8)
Mean daily minimum °C (°F)	1.3 (34.3)	1.4 (34.5)	3.3 (37.9)	5.0 (41.0)	8.4 (47.1)	11.4 (52.5)	13.5 (56.3)	13.2 (55.8)	10.7 (51.3)	8.0 (46.4)	4.4 (39.9)	2.0 (35.6)	6.9 (44.4)
Record low °C (°F)	−14.9 (5.2)	−13.3 (8.1)	−11.9 (10.6)	−4.9 (23.2)	−1.1 (30.0)	1.1 (34.0)	5.0 (41.0)	5.6 (42.1)	−0.4 (31.3)	−6.2 (20.8)	−10.1 (13.8)	−11.6 (11.1)	−14.9 (5.2)
Average precipitation mm (inches)	54.3 (2.14)	47.3 (1.86)	50.8 (2.00)	41.8 (1.65)	57.9 (2.28)	63.1 (2.48)	66.4 (2.61)	67.6 (2.66)	52.1 (2.05)	60.1 (2.37)	63.9 (2.52)	68.8 (2.71)	694.1 (27.33)
Average precipitation days (≥ 1.0 mm)	11.3	9.9	10.0	9.1	9.6	9.2	9.9	9.4	8.9	10.7	12.0	12.3	122.3
Source: Météo-France

== Population ==
Historical population

Year	Pop.	±% p.a.
1800	16,918	—
1806	19,016	+1.97%
1821	19,906	+0.31%
1831	18,953	−0.49%
1836	19,499	+0.57%
1841	21,343	+1.82%
1846	22,040	+0.64%
1851	23,263	+1.09%
1856	24,229	+0.82%
1861	24,966	+0.60%
1866	24,344	−0.50%
1872	24,662	+0.22%
1876	26,083	+1.41%
1881	27,607	+1.14%
1886	27,575	−0.02%
1891	28,700	+0.80%
1896	29,912	+0.83%
1901	30,946	+0.68%

Year	Pop.	±% p.a.
1906	31,759	+0.52%
1911	34,766	+1.83%
1921	34,425	−0.10%
1926	40,023	+3.06%
1931	42,359	+1.14%
1936	42,564	+0.10%
1946	38,684	−0.95%
1954	43,434	+1.46%
1962	45,379	+0.55%
1968	46,626	+0.45%
1975	42,473	−1.32%
1982	40,275	−0.76%
1990	38,441	−0.58%
1999	41,278	+0.79%
2007	42,670	+0.42%
2012	42,989	+0.15%
2017	43,336	+0.16%
2023	43,468	+0.05%

Source: EHESS and INSEE (1968-2023)

== Main sights ==
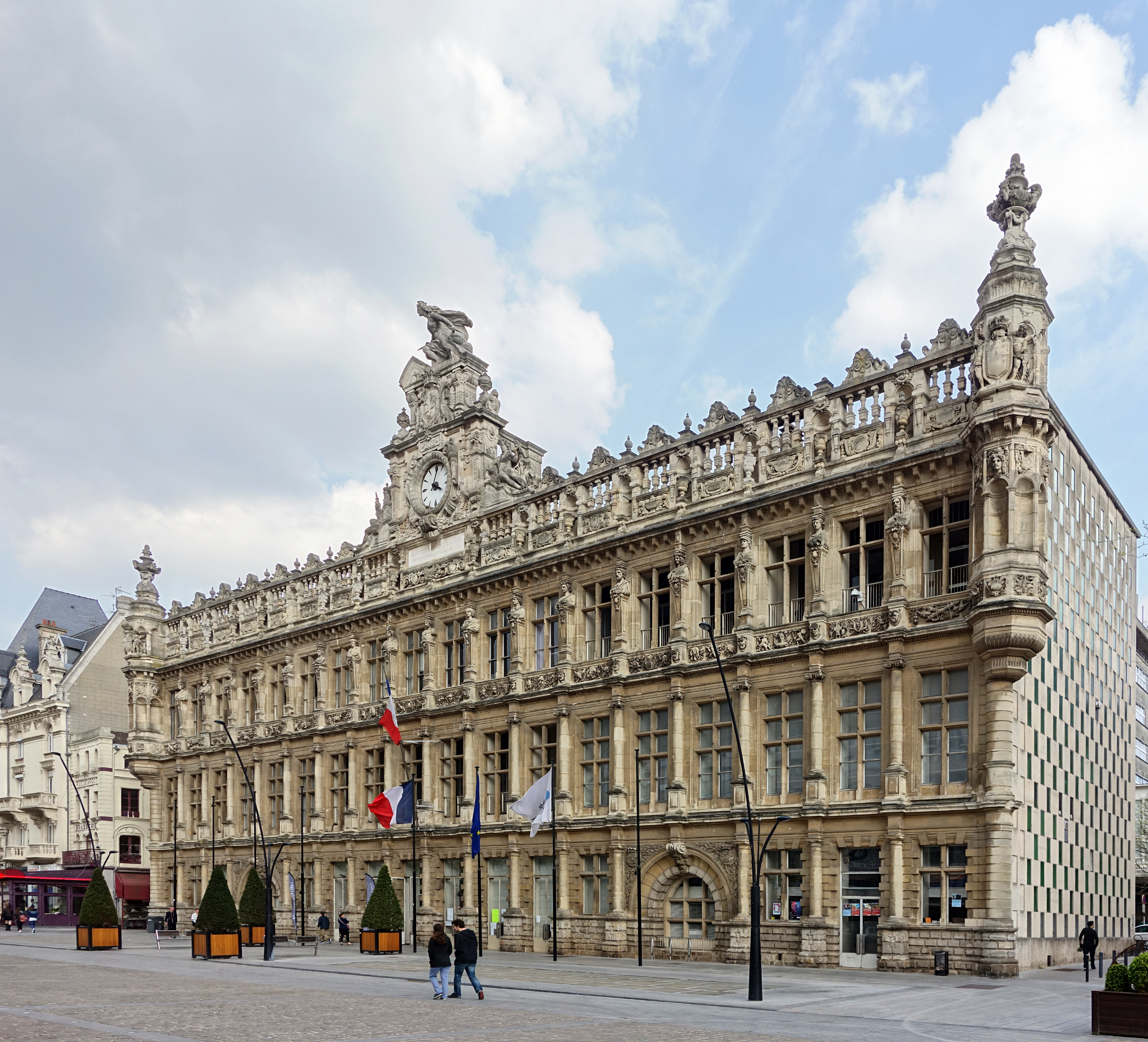
The Hôtel de Ville (City Hall)

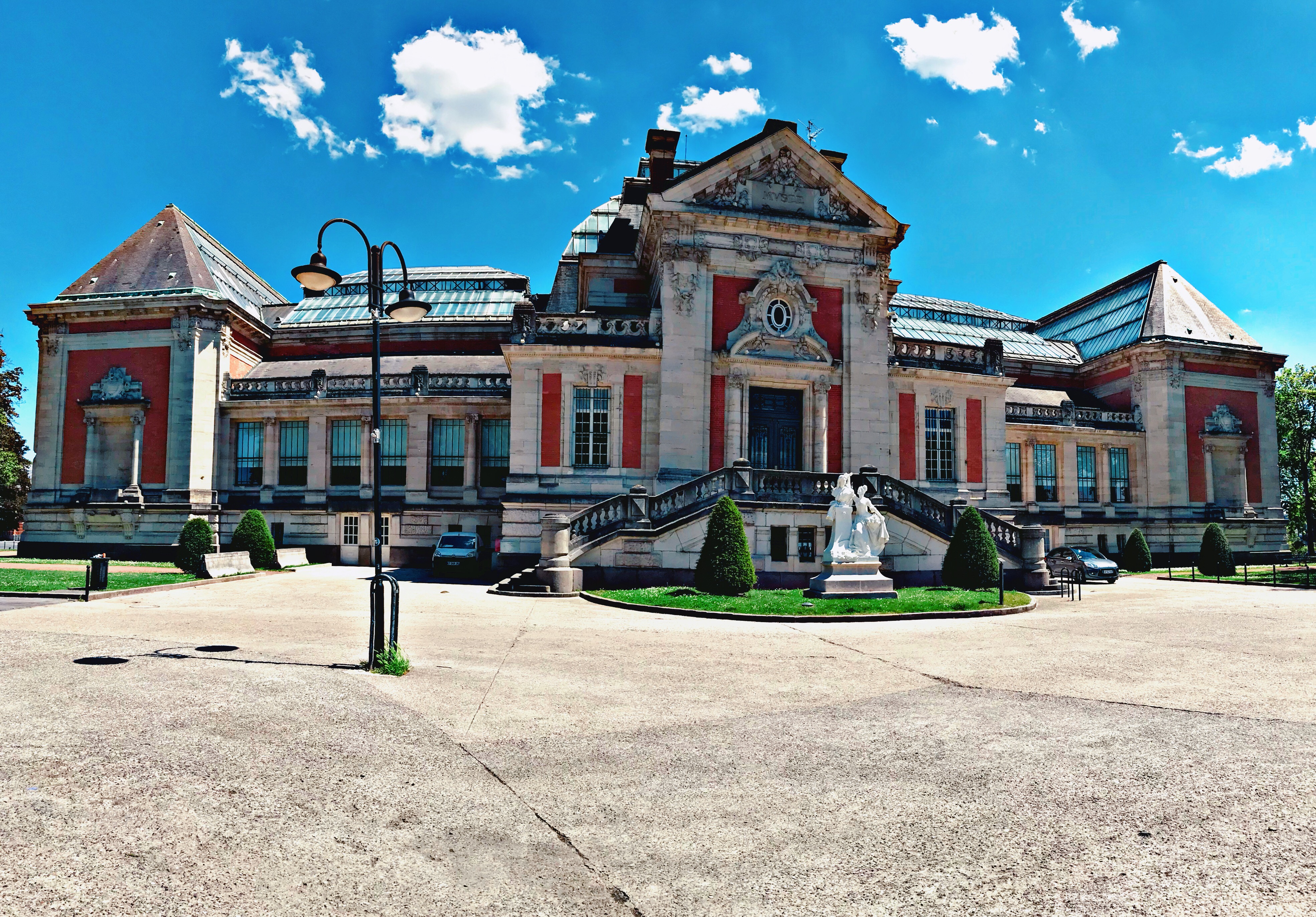
Museum of Fine Arts of Valenciennes

The Hindenburg Line ran through Valenciennes during World War I, leading to extensive destruction. Valenciennes was again almost completely destroyed during World War II, and has since been rebuilt in concrete.

A few surviving monuments are: 1) The façade of the Hôtel de Ville (City Hall), which managed to survive the bombardments of the war; 2) the Basilica of Notre-Dame du Saint-Cordon, to which there is an annual pilgrimage; 3) La Maison Espagnole, the remains of the Spanish occupation, which ended in 1678. The building was formerly home to the tourist office of the city. The tourist office is now located next to the Museum of Fine Arts, in the former mount of piety.

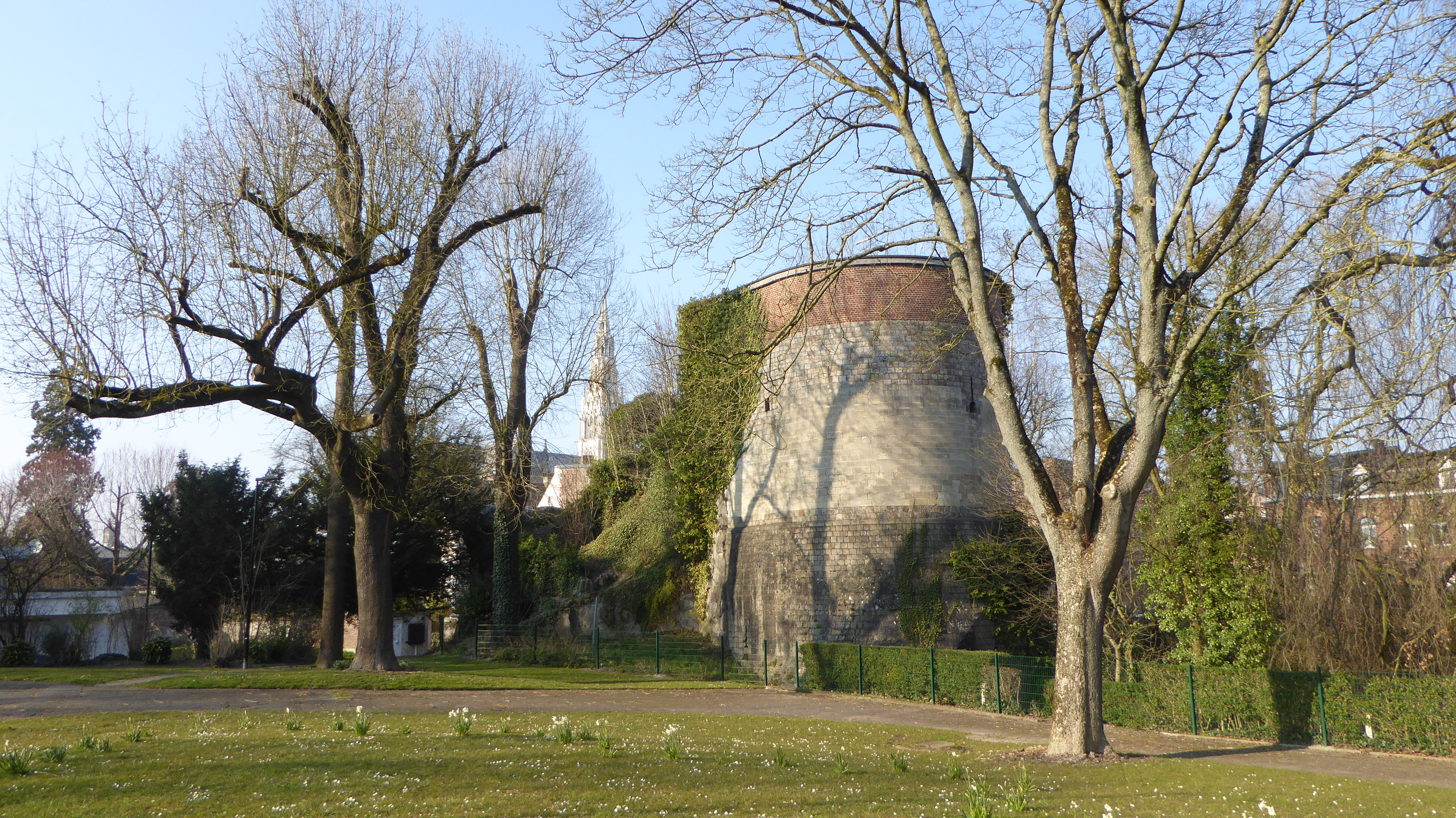
The Dodenne Tower

4) The Dodenne Tower, the remaining part of the medieval fortifications after Charles V ordered them reduced; 5) Théâtre le Phenix, a theatre and performing arts venue constructed in 1998; 6) The "Beffroi", a large, pin-like monument 45 m (148 ft) in height, was built in 2007 by Jean-Bernard Métais on the Place d'Armes (main square), site of the former belfry.

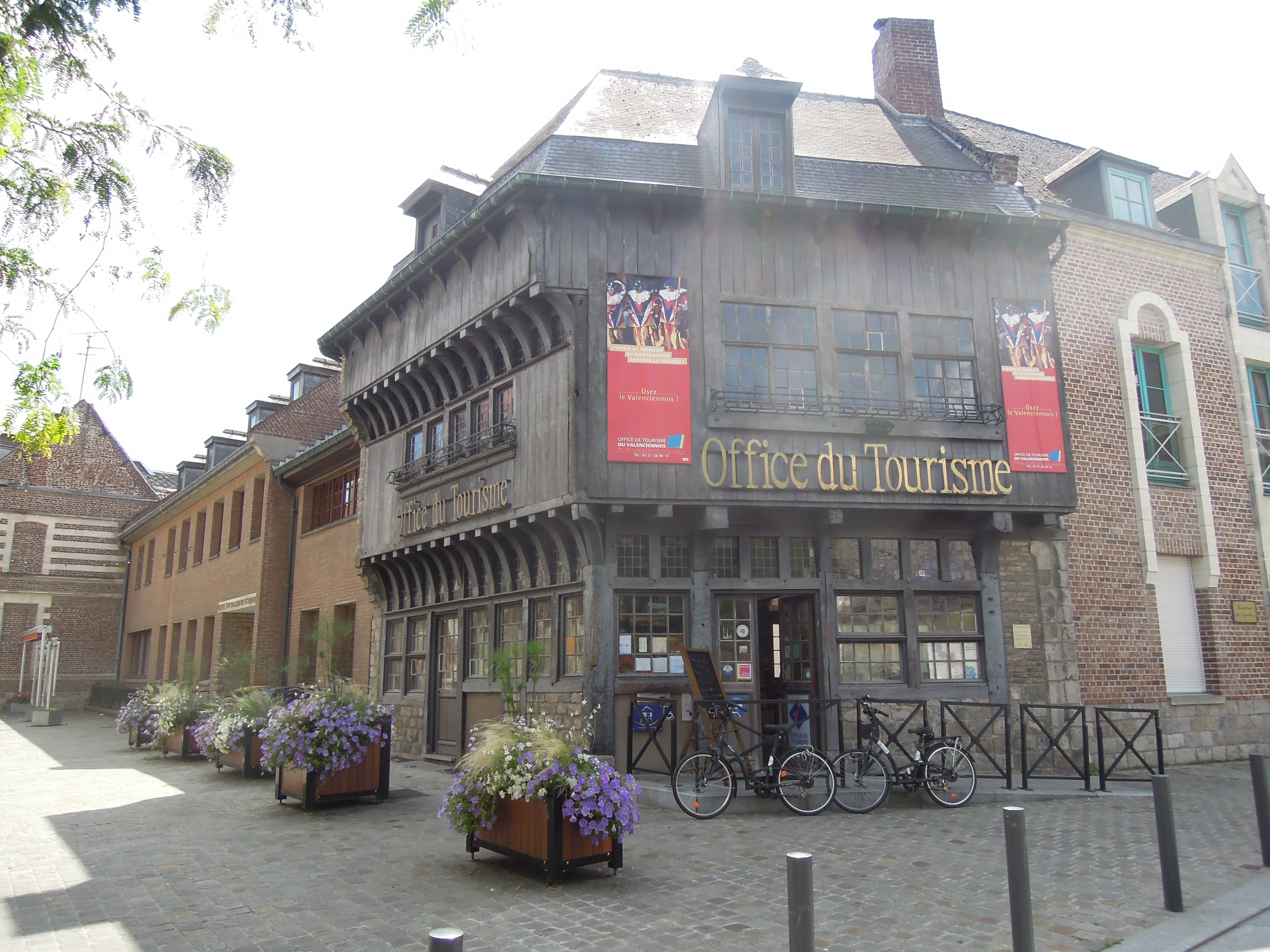
The "Maison Espagnole", former tourist information office of the city

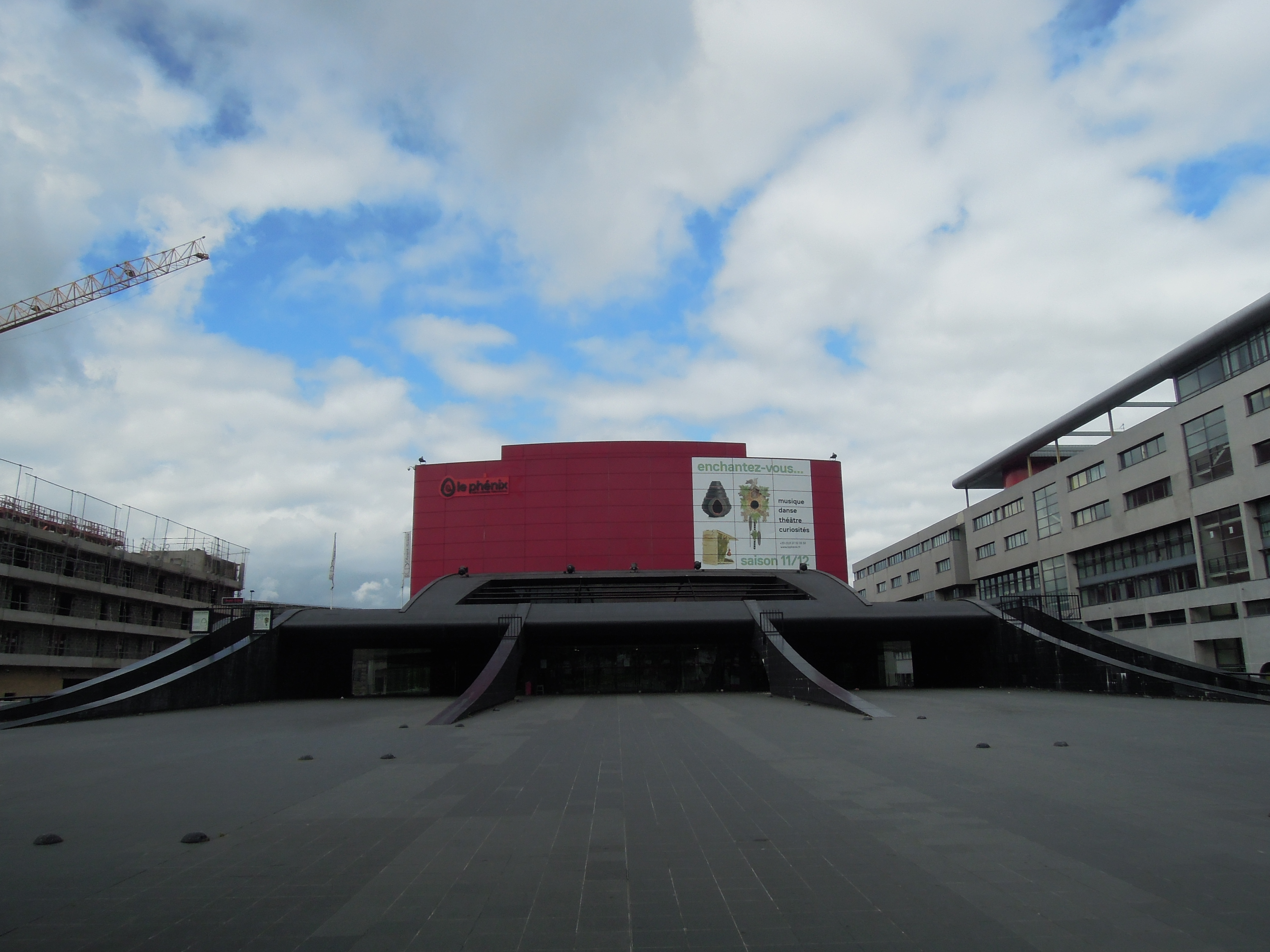
Théâtre Le Phénix

== Economy ==
Valenciennes is historically renowned for its lace. Until the 1970s, the main industries were steel and textiles. Since their decline, reconversion attempts focus mainly on automobile production. In 2001, Toyota built its Western European assembly line for the Toyota Yaris in Onnaing near Valenciennes. Sevel has an assembly facility at nearby Lieu-Saint-Amand. Because of this and other changes, the average unemployment in the region is now below the national average. The nearby town of Petite-Forêt is home to major Alstom workshops.

On 15 July 2004, the Administrative Board of the European Union's Railway Agency held its first meeting in Phénix, with representatives of the 25 Member States and François Lamoureux, those days Director General for Energy and Transportation at the European Commission. Valenciennes was picked as the European Railway Agency headquarters in December 2003. International conferences are held in Lille.

== Public transport ==
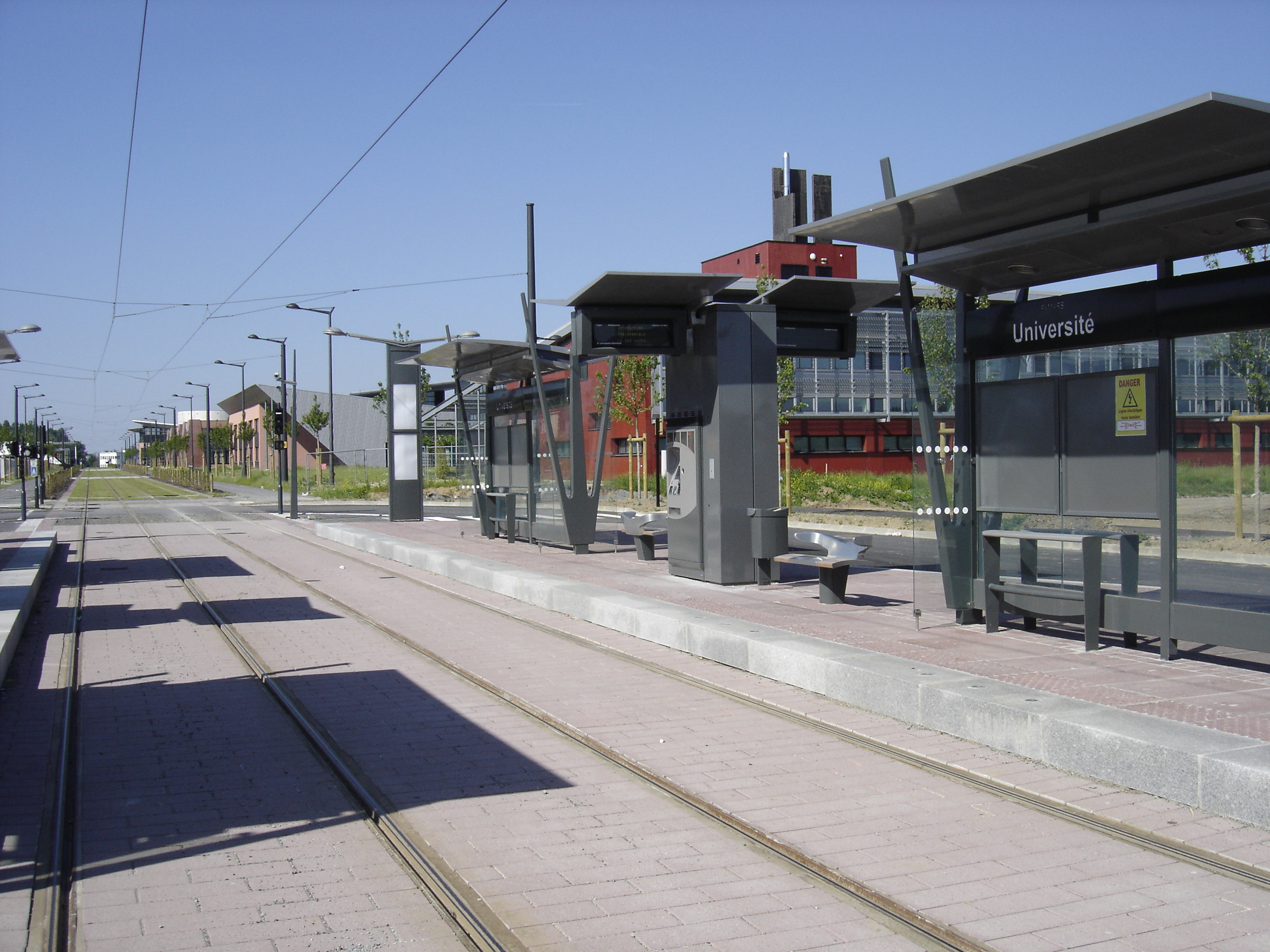
Valenciennes tramway line No. 1 – Université Station

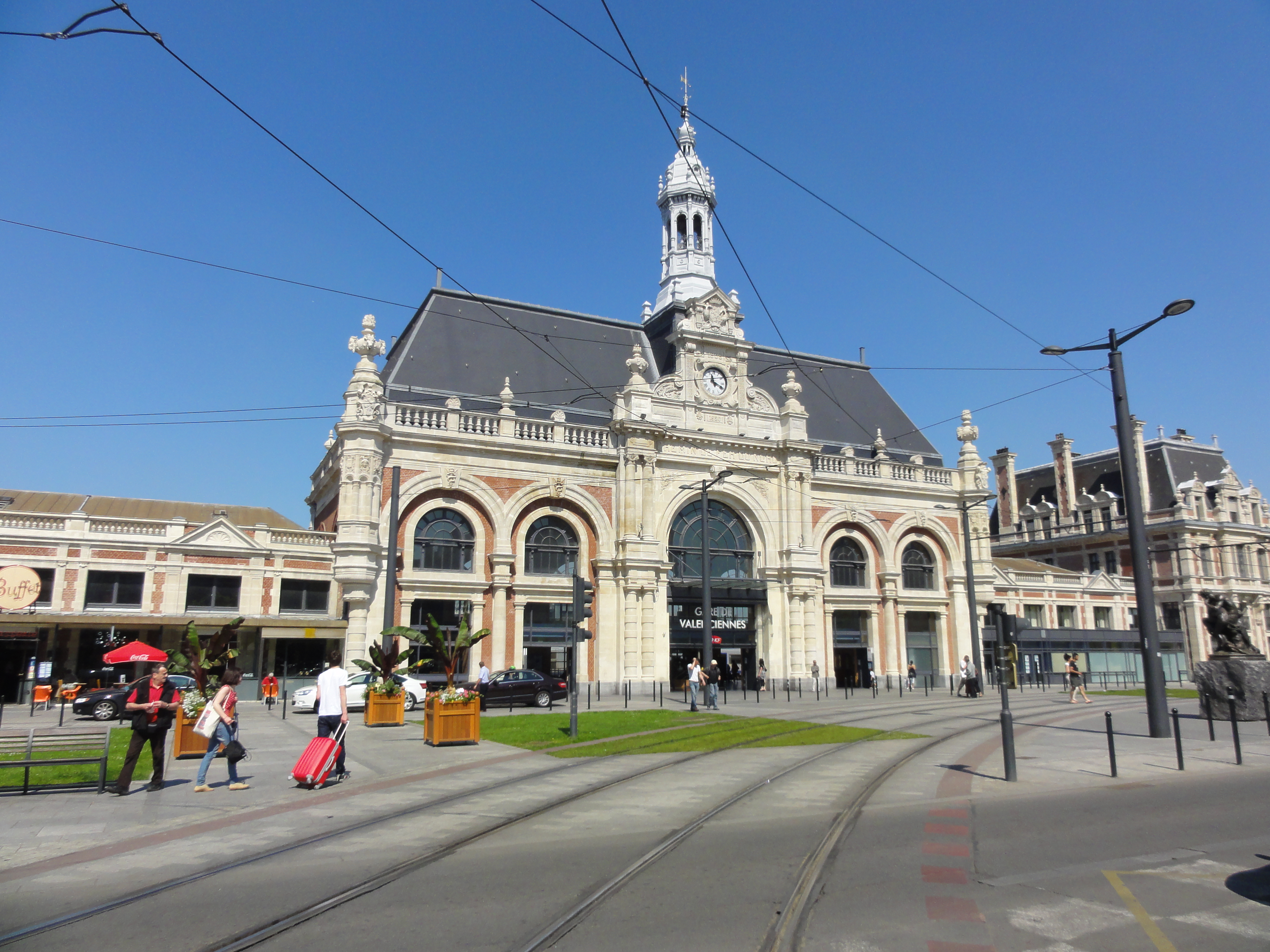
Gare de Valenciennes

Line No. 1 of the Tramway de Valenciennes was put into service on 3 July 2006. 9.5 km (5.9 mi) long, this tramway crosses the five communes in the Valenciennois Metropolitan area, at a cost of 242.75 million Euros. On 24 February 2014, Line No. 2 was put into service. It links Valenciennes to Vieux-Condé (near the Belgian border).

Valenciennes railway station offers connections with Lille, Paris and several regional destinations.

== Administration ==
Valenciennes is a subprefecture of the Nord département.

=== Mayors since 1947 ===
- 1947–1988: Pierre Carous, resigned (died in 1990)
- 1988–1989: Olivier Marlière
- 1989–2002: Jean-Louis Borloo, resigned when he entered the national government
- 2002–2012: Dominique Riquet
- 2012–present: Laurent Degallaix

== Education ==
The municipality has eight individual preschools.

The municipality has eight individual primary schools and four school groups.

The municipality has five junior high schools (three public and two private) and seven senior high schools/sixth form colleges (four public and three private).

== Notable people ==
- Arnulf of Valenciennes, lord of the fort of Valenciennes
- Louis Auvray (1810–1890), sculptor
- Louis Bailly (1881–1974), French-Canadian violist and music educator
- Baldwin I, Latin Emperor (1172–c.1205), first Emperor of the Latin Empire of Constantinople
- Yves Balmer (born 1978), French and Swiss composer
- Charles Barbier (1767–1841), inventor of several forms of shorthand
- Émile Basly (1854–1928), trade unionist
- André Beauneveu (c.1335–c.1400), sculptor and painter
- Jean-Baptiste Bélanger (1790–1874), mathematician
- Yassin Ben Balla (born 1996), footballer
- Martin Berteau (1691–1771), cellist and composer
- Benjamin Berton (born 1974), writer
- Jean-Louis Borloo (born 1951), politician
- Alfred-Alphonse Bottiau (1889–1951), sculptor
- Eugène Bozza, (1905–1991), composer and violinist
- Hubert Cailleau (1526–1590), painter
- Jean-Baptiste Carpeaux (1827–1875), sculptor, painter and tutor
- Louis Cattiaux (1904–1953), philosopher, painter and poet
- William Chambers (1809–1882), Welsh politician
- Bruno Chérier (1817–1880), decorative painter
- Bernard Chiarelli (born 1934), footballer
- Alphonse Chigot (1824–1917), historical painter, soldier and art tutor, particularly associated with the city of Valenciennes
- Eugène Chigot (1860–1923), post impressionist painter and official painter for the Marine Nationale
- Gustave Crauck (1827–1905), sculptor and painter
- Louise d'Épinay (1726–1783), writer
- Jean d'Oisy (1310–1377), architect
- Philippe d'Outreman (1585–1652), Jesuit writer
- Gérald Darmanin (born 1982), politician
- Felipe-Emmanuel de Bette (1677–1742), soldier and noble from the Spanish Netherlands
- Philippe III de Croÿ (1526–1595), Stadtholder of Flanders
- Charles de Gaulle (1837–1880), poet
- Emanuel Philibert de Lalaing (1557–1590), noble and army commander
- Charles de Lannoy (c.1487–1527), soldier and statesman
- Giovanni de Macque (1548/1550–1614), composer
- Abel de Pujol (1785–1861), painter
- Jennifer de Temmerman (born 1977), politician
- Herman de Valenciennes, 12th-century poet
- Marc Antoine René de Voyer (1722–1787), diplomat and politician
- Patrick Defossez (born 1959), Belgian composer and pianist
- Laurent Degallaix (born 1965), politician
- Grégoire Delacourt (born 1960), advertiser and writer
- Marine Deleeuw (born 1994), model
- Bruno Deletré (born 1961), banker
- Jules Delsart (1844–1900), cellist
- Léon Delsarte (1893–1963), gymnast
- Yohan Demont (born 1978), footballer
- Béatrice Descamps (born 1951), politician
- Hyacinthe François Joseph Despinoy (1764–1848), general
- Félix-Alexandre Desruelles (1865–1943), sculptor
- Collingwood Dickson (1817–1904), British Army officer
- Arthur Dinaux (1795–1864), journalist
- Isabelle Dinoire (1967–2016), first person to undergo a partial face transplant
- Louis Dorus (1812–1896), classical flautist
- Pierre Dubois (born 1945), author
- Michel Duchaussoy (1938–2012), film actor
- Julie Dufour (born 2001), footballer
- Léon Dumont (1837–1877), psychologist and philosopher
- Geordan Dupire (born 1993), footballer
- Philogène Auguste Joseph Duponchel (1774–1846), soldier and entomologist
- François-Joseph Duret (1729–1816), sculptor
- Christophe Dussart (born 1976), footballer
- Victor Duvant (1889–1963), gymnast
- Martine Duvivier (born 1953), middle distance runner
- Charles-Dominique-Joseph Eisen (1720–1778), painter and engraver
- François Eisen, painter and engraver
- Lara Escudero (born 1993), ice hockey player
- Léon Fagel (1851–1913), sculptor
- Denis Flahaut (born 1978), road cyclist
- Henry of Flanders (c.1178–1216), Latin emperor of Constantinople
- Jean Froissart (1337–1405), historian and poet
- Albert Gazier (1908–1997), trade union leader and politician
- Bernard Gérard (born 1953), politician
- Jacques Gestraut (born 1939), cyclist
- Alfred Mathieu Giard (1846–1908), zoologist
- Valérie Gomez-Bassac (born 1969), politician
- Pierre Gossez (1928–2001), jazz musician
- René Guilleré (1878–1931), lawyer
- Isabella of Hainault (1170–1190), Queen of France as the first wife of King Philip II
- Philippa of Hainault (1310/1315–1369), Queen of England
- Marie of Hainaut (1280–1354), daughter of John II, Count of Holland and Philippa of Luxembourg
- Henri Harpignies (1819–1916), painter and watercolourist
- John Hay Drummond Hay (1816–1893), United Kingdom's Envoy Extraordinary at the Court of Morocco
- Henry VII (c. 1273–1313), Holy Roman Emperor
- Ernest-Eugène Hiolle (1834–1886), sculptor
- Georges Huisman (1889–1957), historian and politician
- Jérémie Janot (born 1977), footballer
- Jean-Baptiste Janson (1742–1803), cellist and composer
- Fabrice Jaumont, author, educator, advocate for dual-language bilingual education
- Éric Joly (born 1972), footballer
- Catherine Kamowski (born 1958), politician
- Marie Kubiak (born 1981), footballer
- Edmond Marin la Meslée (1912–1945), fighter pilot in World War II
- Sofian Laidouni (born 1995), kickboxer
- Charles Joseph Lambert (1804–1864), explorer and engineer
- Bruno Lanvin (born 1954), business academic
- Joseph Layraud (1834–1912), painter
- Claude Le Jeune (1528 to 1530–1600), Franco-Flemish composer
- Olivier Le May (1734–1797), painter and engraver
- Jean-René Lecerf (born 1951), politician
- Violette Leduc (1907–1972), writer
- Jean Lefebvre (1919–2004), film actor
- Julien Leghait (born 1994), footballer
- Philippe Joseph Henri Lemaire (1798–1880), sculptor
- Rosalie Levasseur (1749–1826), soprano
- Pierre Joseph Michel Lorquin (1797–1873), entomologist
- Nathalie Lupino (born 1963), judoka
- Hélène Mannarino (born 1990), journalist, television, and radio presenter
- Julien Masson (born 1998), footballer
- Rudy Mater (born 1980), footballer
- Edma Morisot (1839–1921), artist
- Éric Mouquet (born 1960), musician
- Sarah Moussaddak (born 2000), kickboxer
- Freeman Murray (1804–1885), British Army general
- Christian Nau (1944–2022), land sailor and writer
- Frédéric Nihous (born 1967), politician
- Cécile Nowak (born 1967), judoka
- Charles Nungesser (1892–1927), ace pilot and adventurer
- Henri Parent (1819–1895), architect
- François Paris (born 1961), composer
- T. J. Parker (born 1984), basketballer
- Jean-Baptiste Pater (1695–1736), painter
- Vendémiaire Pavot (1883–1929), sculptor
- Raymond Pech (1876–1952), composer
- Sylvie Pétiaux (1836–1919), feminist and pacifist
- Jane Pierny (1869–1913), soprano
- Marcel Pinte (1938–1944), member of the French Resistance
- Arnauld Pontier, writer
- Jacob Farrand Pringle (1816–1901), Canadian judge, soldier, and politician
- Joris Jansen Rapelje (1604–1662/63), member of the Council of Twelve Men
- André Renard (1911–1962), Belgian trade union leader
- Léon Renard (1836–1916), politician
- Véronique Renties (born 1960), middle distance runner
- Pierre Richard (born 1934), actor, film director and screenwriter
- Léon Richet (1843–1907), landscape painter
- Dominique Riquet (born 1946), surgeon and politician
- Auguste Désiré Saint-Quentin (1838–1906), painter
- Jacques Saly (1717–1776), sculptor
- Rémi Sénéca (born 1995), rugby union player
- Elinor Sneshell, English barber-surgeon
- Fred Soyez (born 1978), field hockey coach
- Jean Stablinski (1932–2007), cyclist
- Clément Tainmont (born 1986), footballer
- Fabien Thiémé (1952–2019), politician
- Théophile Tilmant (1799–1878), violinist
- Renier of Trit, knight from Trith-Saint-Léger, Hainaut
- Jean Baptiste Vanmour (1671–1737), Flemish-French painter
- Julia Wagret (born 1999), ice dancer
- Henri-Alexandre Wallon (1812–1904), historian and statesman
- Mallory Wanecque (born 2006), actress
- Jean-Antoine Watteau (1684–1721), painter
- Louis Joseph Watteau (1731–1798), painter
- Robert Witchitz (1924–1944), volunteer soldier in the French liberation force
- Bruno Wojtinek (born 1963), racing cyclist

• Marguerite Porete (born 1258-1310), author of The Mirror of the Simple Souls. Considered heretical her book was burned in the Place d’Armes in Valenciennes in 1306.

== Sport ==
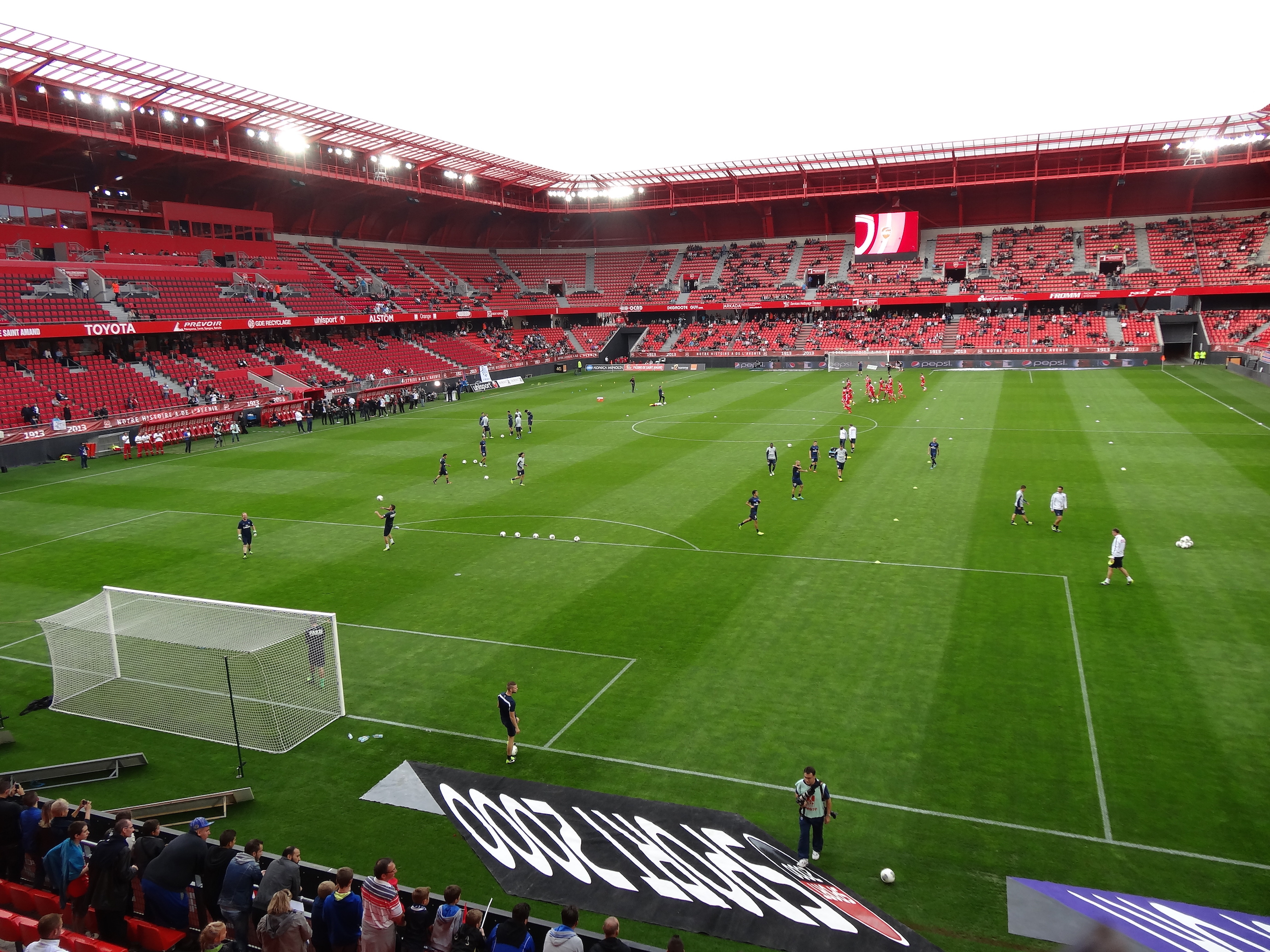
Stade du Hainaut

Valenciennes FC is based in the city.

== Twin towns – sister cities ==
Valenciennes is twinned with:

- Agrigento, Italy
- Central AO (Moscow), Russia
- Düren, Germany
- Gliwice, Poland
- Medway, England, United Kingdom
- Yichang, China

== See also ==
- Vendémiaire Pavot Sculptor of La Faunesse in Valenciennes
