= Hôtel de Ville, Valenciennes =

Town hall in Valenciennes, France

Hôtel de Ville
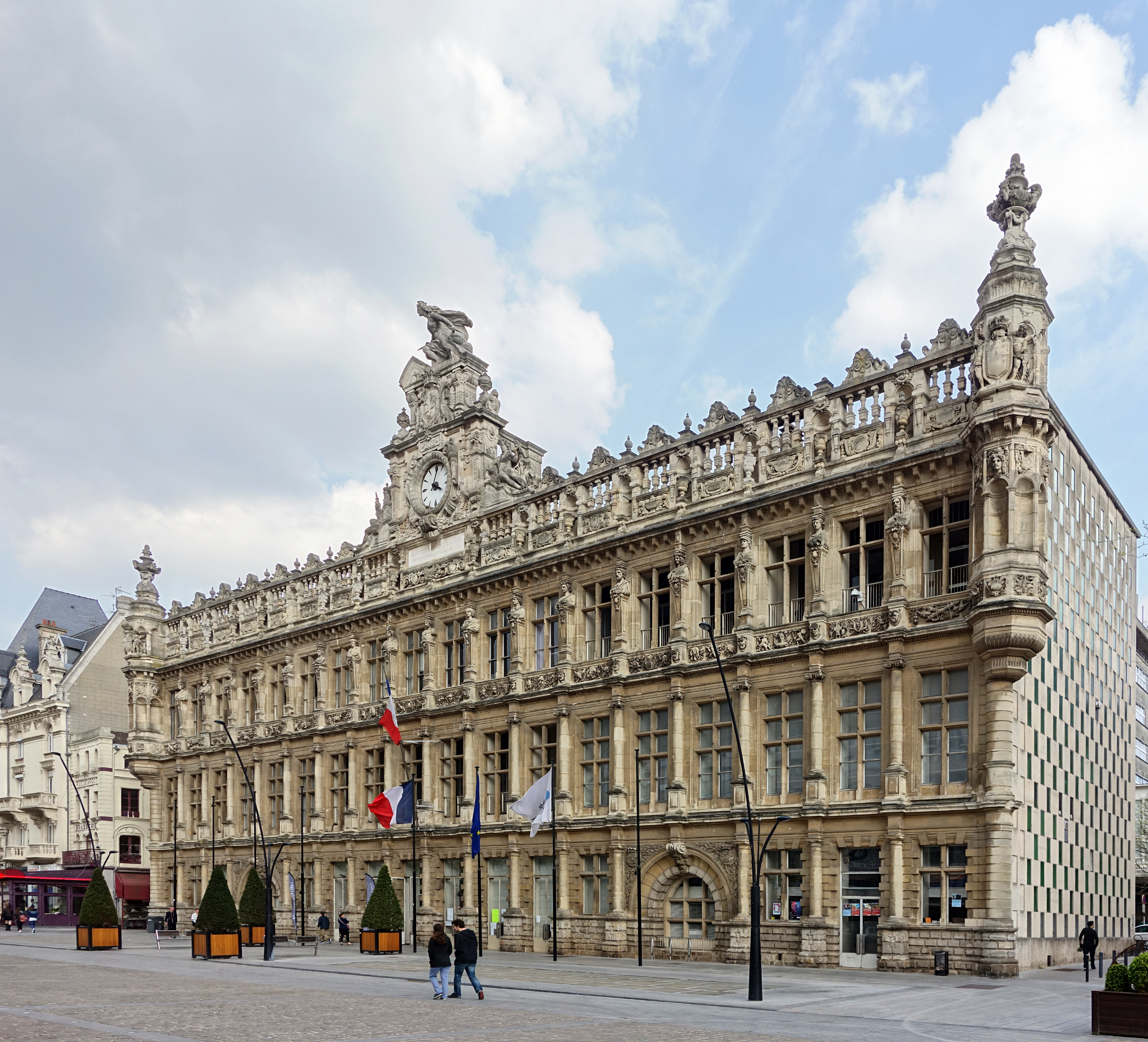
- The main frontage of the Hôtel de Ville in April 2014

General information
- Type: City hall
- Architectural style: Gothic style
- Location: Valenciennes, France
- Coordinates: 50.3578°N 3.5242°E
- Completed: 1870

Design and construction
- Architect: Jules-Louis Batigny

Monument historique
- Official name: Hôtel de ville
- Type: Inscrit
- Designated: 2001
- Reference no.: PA59000073

The Hôtel de Ville (French pronunciation: [otɛl də vil], City Hall) is a municipal building in Valenciennes, Nord, north France, standing on the Place d'Armes. It was designated a monument historique by the French government in 2001.

== History ==
Early meetings of the local council were held in the alderman's house, on the east side of the Place d'Armes, which dated back at least to the early 12th century. In 1611, the city provost, Jean Roisin, commissioned François Van Paesche to prepare designs for the reconstruction of the building.

The reconstruction, which was extremely expensive and consumed a fifth of the city's budget, was carried out in the Gothic style and took three years to complete. Much of the sculpture was undertaken by Paris Le Prévost. The design involved a symmetrical main frontage of 12 bays facing onto the Place D'Armes. There was an external staircase leading to a porch in the seventh bay from the left. All three floors were fenestrated by tall mullioned and transomed and there was an elaborate frieze below the second floor windows. The ground-floor bays were flanked by Doric order columns, while the first-floor bays were flanked by Ionic order columns, and the second-floor bays were flanked by caryatids. At roof level, there was a modillioned cornice and an elaborate balustrade.

An art gallery was established in the town hall in 1834: important works in the collection included the Saint Stephen Triptych by Peter Paul Rubens, which had been seized from Saint-Amand Abbey during the French Revolution.

By the mid-19th century, the building had become dilapidated, and the council commissioned an architect, Jules-Louis Batigny, to remodel the façade. Work began in 1867 and was complete by 1870. The design was very similar to the 17th century structure, but the building was extended by an extra six bays to the north using the site of the former Chapel of St Pierre, which had been deconsecrated and converted into a grain market during the French Revolution and then demolished in 1828. On the ground floor, the external staircase and porch were removed and replaced by six square headed doorways in the central six bays. There were Diocletian windows with voussoirs and keystones in the fourth bay from each end, and the other bays were fenestrated by cross-windows. The style of the windows on the first and second floors was unchanged from before. Bartizans were added at the corners of the building and, at roof level, there was a new pediment, which contained a clock.

The pediment was flanked by statues created by the sculptor, Philippe Joseph Henri Lemaire, intended to recall the rivers Escaut and Rhonelle, and was surmounted by a statue created by the sculptor, Jean-Baptiste Carpeaux, intended to commemorate the lives of the citizens who defended the city during the Siege of Valenciennes in 1793. Carpeaux had originally proposed a large relief depicting the siege, but this was rejected in favour of the statue. A bell tower was installed behind the pediment. The municipal art collection was transferred to the newly built Musée des Beaux-Arts in Boulevard Watteau in June 1909.

The building was badly damaged in a fire which destroyed much of the centre of the city on the night of 21 May 1940, during the Second World War. The façade was saved but the building itself was gutted, and the pediment and bell tower crashed to the ground. The restoration of the building began in 1953. The structure behind the façade was rebuilt to a design by Jean Vergnaud and the pediment was restored, without the bell tower, by Albert Patrisse. The building was officially re-opened by the president of France, Charles de Gaulle, on 26 September 1959.
