= Vic-sur-Seille =

- Commune
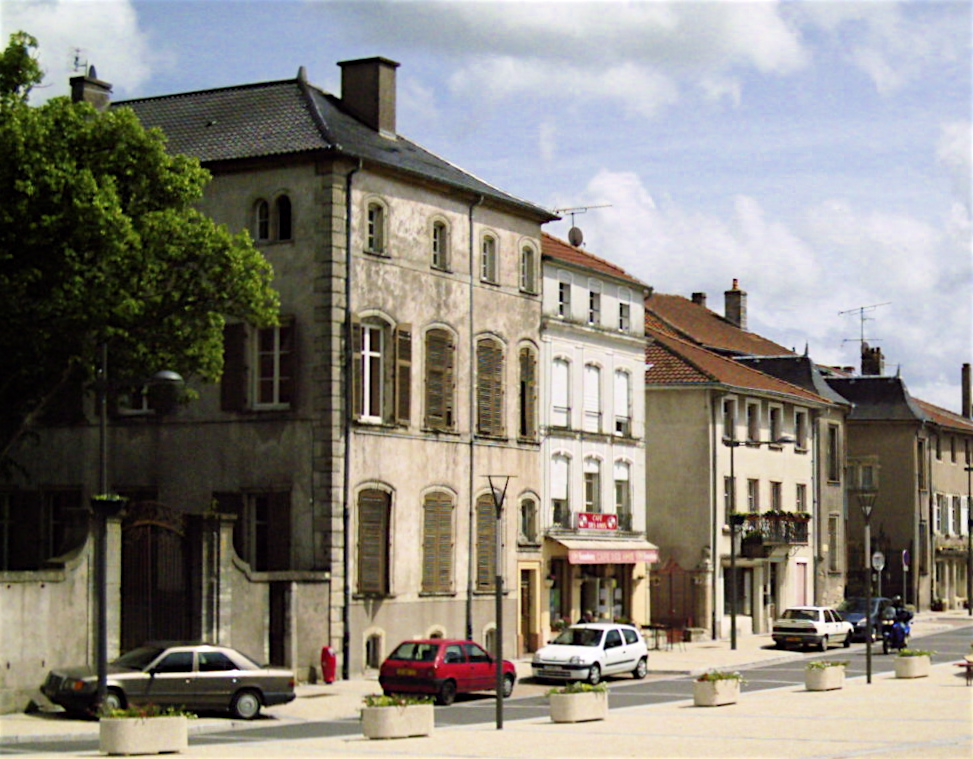
- Place Jeanne d'Arc

- Coat of arms
- Location of Vic-sur-Seille
- Location within France Location within Grand Est
- Coordinates: 48°46′59″N 6°31′56″E
- Country: France
- Region: Grand Est
- Department: Moselle
- Arrondissement: Sarrebourg-Château-Salins
- Canton: Le Saulnois
- Intercommunality: CC du Saulnois

Government
  - Mayor (2020–2026): Jérôme End
- Area^{1}: 19.5 km^{2} (7.5 sq mi)
- Elevation: 200 m (660 ft)
- Highest elevation: 315 m (1,033 ft)
- Lowest elevation: 195 m (640 ft)
- Population (2023): 1,317
  - Density: 67.5/km^{2} (175/sq mi)
- Time zone: UTC+01:00 (CET)
  - Summer (DST): UTC+02:00 (CEST)
- INSEE/Postal code: 57712 /57630
- ^{1} French Land Register data, which excludes lakes, ponds, glaciers > 1 km^{2} (0.386 sq mi or 247 acres) and river estuaries.

Vic-sur-Seille (French pronunciation: [vik syʁ sɛj], literally Vic on Seille; German: Wich) is a commune in the Moselle department in Grand Est in north-eastern France.

== People ==
It was the birthplace of Georges de La Tour.

== Art museum ==
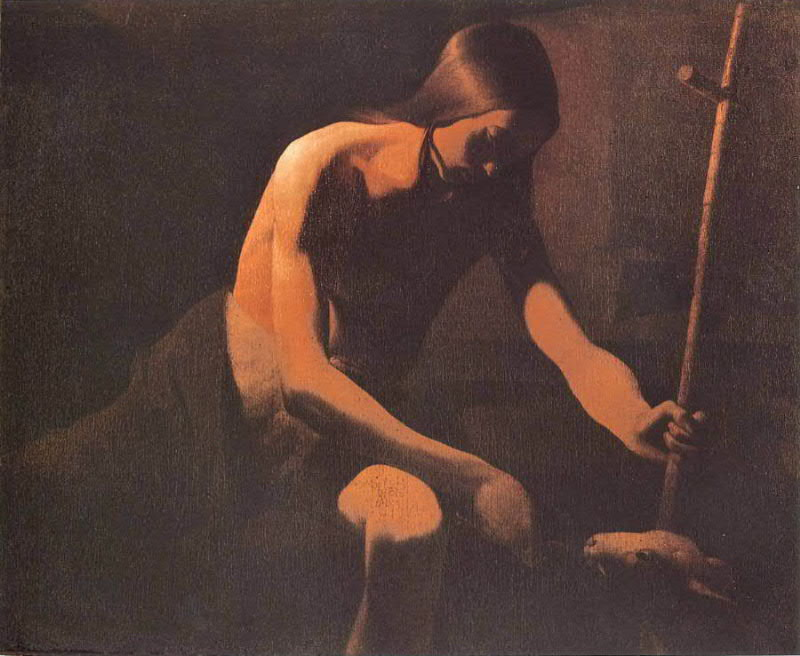
Saint John the Baptist in the desert, Georges de La Tour, c. 1651.

The art museum of Vic-sur-Seille, in French Musée départemental Georges-de-La-Tour, was created in 1996. Its most famous work is Saint John the Baptist in the desert, by Georges de La Tour. Its collections include 17th century paintings by Jacques de Létin, Jacques Blanchard, Cesare Dandini, Domenichino, Meiffren Conte, Charles Le Brun, Matthieu Le Nain, Madeleine Boullogne, Jacques Stella, 18th century landscapes and paintings by Sebastiano Ricci, Pierre-Henri de Valenciennes, Jan Frans van Bloemen, Jean-Bernard Restout, Joseph-Marie Vien, and 19th century and beginning of the 20th century paintings by Camille Corot, Paul Baudry, Eugène Isabey, Paul Delaroche, Léon Bonnat.

== See also ==
- Communes of the Moselle department
- Parc naturel régional de Lorraine
