= François-Louis-Joseph Watteau =

French painter

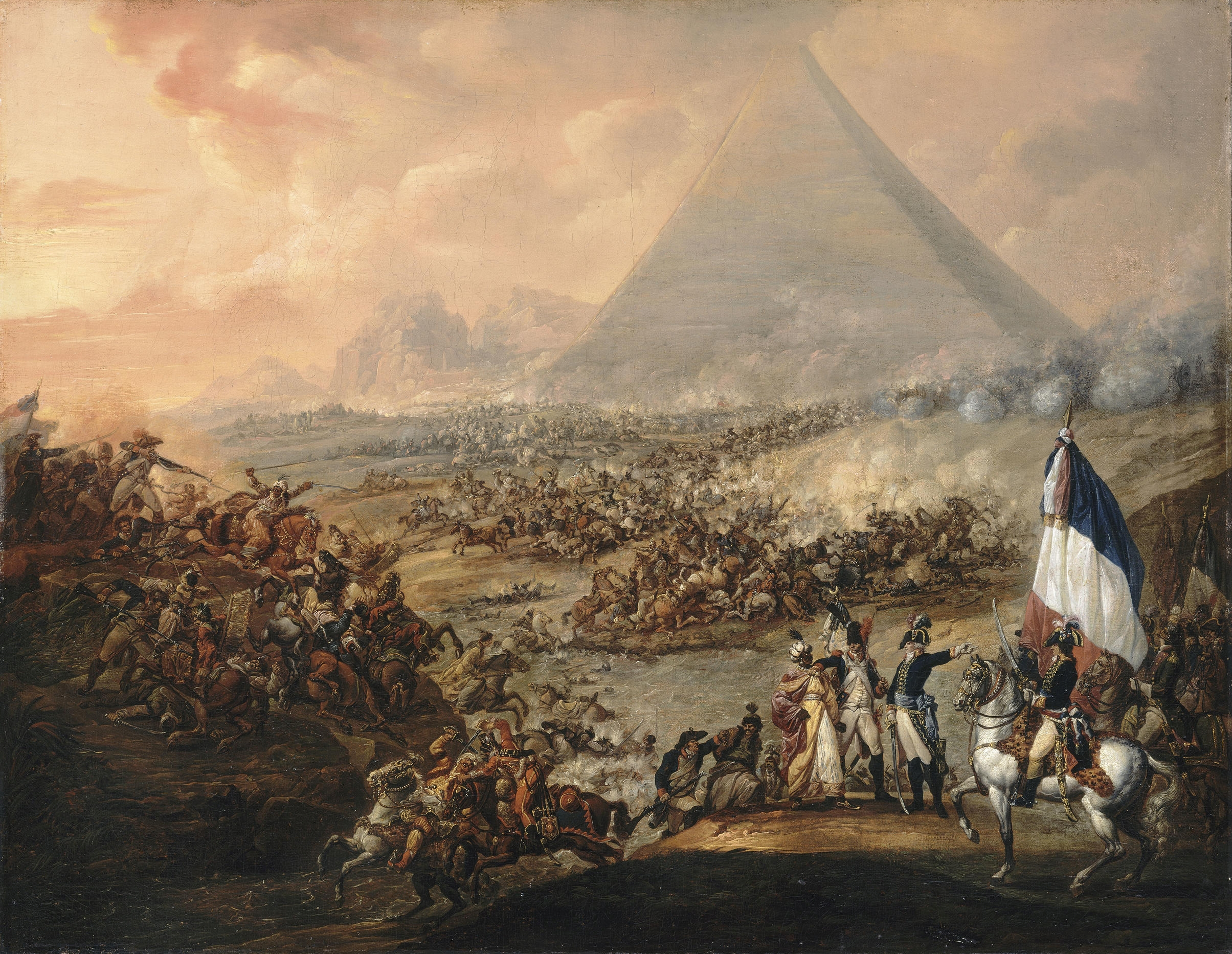
The Battle of the Pyramids (1798–1799; in the Musée des Beaux-Arts de Valenciennes)

François Louis Joseph Watteau (18 August 1758, Lille – 1 December 1823, Lille), known like his father as the Watteau of Lille, was a French painter, active in his birthplace. He was the son of the painter Louis Joseph Watteau (1731–1798) and grandson of Noël Joseph Watteau (1689–1756) – Noël was the brother of Jean-Antoine Watteau, the painter of "fêtes galantes". From 1808 to his death, he was deputy curator of the Palais des Beaux-Arts de Lille, which his father had helped to found.

== Works ==
- The Procession in Lille in 1789, oil on canvas, Musée de l'Hospice Comtesse, Lille
- 1799, The siege of Beauvais in 1472, oil on canvas, Musée des Beaux-Arts, Valenciennes
- c. 1803, La Fête du Broquelet, oil on canvas, Musée de l'Hospice Comtesse, Lille

== Bibliography ==
- Mabille de Poncheville.
- Claude-Gérard Marcus.
- Gaëtane Maës, Les Watteau de Lille, Paris, 1998.
- Vollmer, Hans, ed. (1942). "Watteau, Louis Joseph". Allgemeines Lexikon der bildenden Künstler (in German). Vol. 35. Leipzig: E. A. Seemann. pp. 196–197.
