= Louis Joseph Watteau =

French painter

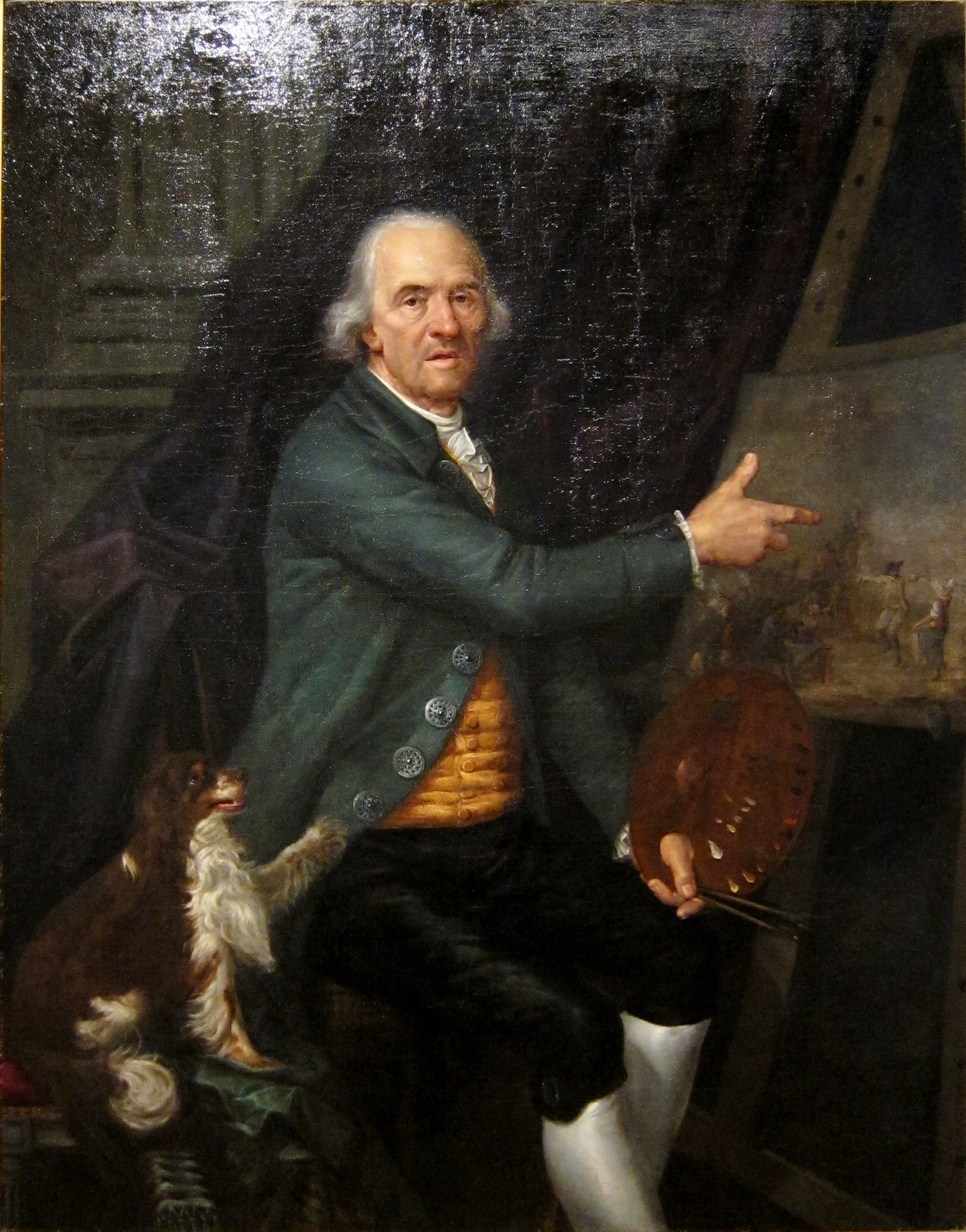
Portrait by Henri A. C. de Mailly, 1798

Louis Joseph Watteau (10 April 1731 – 17 August 1798), known as the Watteau of Lille (a title also given to his son) was a French painter active in Lille.

Watteau was born in Valenciennes. His father Noël Joseph Watteau (1689–1756) was brother to Jean-Antoine Watteau, a painter of fêtes galantes, and he was himself father to the painter François Watteau.

He played a decisive role in the foundation of what would become the Musée des Beaux-Arts de Lille, opened in 1803, by producing the first ever inventory of paintings confiscated by the state during the French Revolution.

He died in Lille, aged 67.

== Works ==
- La Jolie colombe, oil on wood, Musée des Beaux-Arts, Valenciennes
- La 14ème expérience aérostatique de M. Blanchard, oil on canvas, Musée de l'Hospice Comtesse, Lille
- Le Bombardement de Lille, oil on canvas, Musée de l'Hospice Comtesse, Lille
- Le retour des Aéronautes Blanchard et Lépinard, oil on canvas, Musée de l'Hospice Comtesse, Lille

== Bibliography ==
- Mabille de Poncheville.
- Claude-Gérard Marcus.
- Gaëtane Maës, Les Watteau de Lille, Paris, 1998.
- Vollmer, Hans, ed. (1942). "Watteau, Louis Joseph". Allgemeines Lexikon der bildenden Künstler (in German). Vol. 35. Leipzig: E. A. Seemann. p. 197.
