= Musée des Beaux-Arts de Valenciennes =

Museum in Valenciennes, France

- Musée des Beaux-Arts de Valenciennes
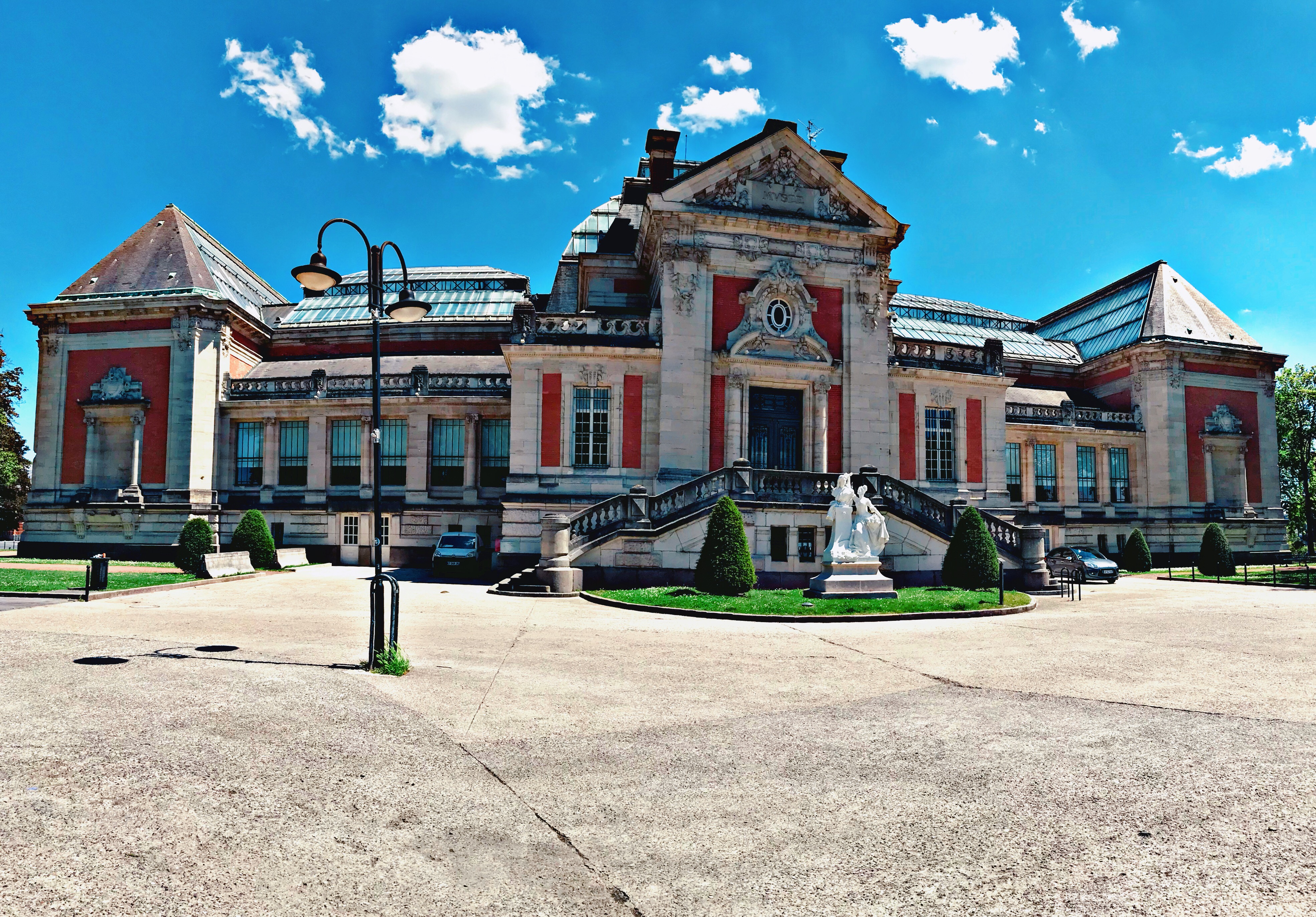
- Outside of the museum
- Established: 1801
- Location: Valenciennes
- Coordinates: 50°21′28″N 3°31′51″E
- Website: https://musee.valenciennes.fr/le-musee

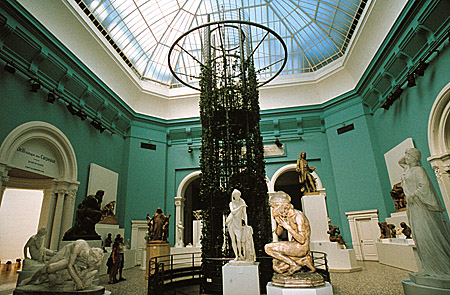
A gallery in the museum

The musée des beaux-arts de Valenciennes is a municipal museum in the French town of Valenciennes. Its collections originated as the collection of the Académie valenciennoise de peinture et de sculpture. It opened to the public for the first time in 1801 and was moved into the Hôtel de Ville in 1834. A competition to design a new building was held at the end of the 19th century, won by Paul Dusart. The new building was opened on 27 June 1909 and in 1995 was totally renovated and the display space expanded, with the addition of a basement displaying archaeological remains and artefacts.

As well as paintings, it includes several sculptures by Jean-Baptiste Carpeaux (1827–1875).

== Paintings ==
Much of the collection is by Flemish artists, though also includes some French and other artists. It dates from the Middle Ages to the 20th century:

- Flemish and Dutch painting - Primitives to 17th century
- 15th and 16th centuries - works by Jan Provoost, Joos van Cleve, The Banker and His Wife after Marinus van Reymerswale, Pieter Coecke van Aelst, Maerten de Vos, Jan Sanders van Hemessen and Frans Pourbus the Elder as well as many anonymous works
- 17th century - works by Jan Brueghel the Elder, Frans Pourbus the Younger, Paul Rubens, Antony van Dyck, Jacob Jordaens, Adriaen Brouwer, Gaspard de Crayer, David Teniers the Younger, Frans Snyders, Cornelis Norbertus Gysbrechts, Willem Kalf, Hendrick van Balen, Adriaen van Utrecht, Peter Lely, Jan Davidsz de Heem, Jacob van Es, Abraham Janssens, Pieter Snayers, Pieter Neefs the Elder, Jan Boeckhorst, Jacques D'arthois and Abraham Willaerts
- French painting - works by Charles Mellin, Meiffren Conte, Sébastien Bourdon, Noël Nicolas Coypel, Antoine Watteau (born in the town) and his family, Jean-Baptiste Pater, François de Troy, Nicolas Lancret, François Boucher (Pastoral Scene), Charles André van Loo, Henri Harpignies, Hubert Robert, Camille Pissarro and Georges Rouault
- Italian painting - a few works, notably including Ruins by Giovanni Paolo Pannini.

=== Selected works ===
- Descent from the Cross, Peter Paul Rubens, oil on canvas (17th century)
- Saint Stephen Triptych (formed of The Martyrdom of St Stephen, The Preaching of St Stephen, The Annunciation and The Angel of the Annunciation) by Peter Paul Rubens, oil on canvas and panel (1600–1650).
- Elijah and the Angel in the Desert and The Triumph of the Catholic Faith (from The Triumph of the Eucharist cycle), Peter Paul Rubens, oil on canvas (1626–1628).
- Still Life with Ham, Jacob van Es, oil on canvas (17th century).
- Herminius in the Shepherds’ Home, Olivier Le May, oil on canvas, 1785.
- Landscape with Rainbow, Peter Paul Rubens and studio, oil on canvas (17th century).
- Saint Paul, Antony van Dyck, oil on panel (1600–1650).
- Saint Matthew, Antony van Dyck, oil on panel (1600–1650).
- True Gaiety by Jean Antoine Watteau, oil on panel.
- Two Figures from a Fêtes Galante by Jean Antoine Watteau, red chalk drawing.
- The Happy Dover by Louis Watteau de Lille, oil on panel.
- The Siege of Beauvais in 1472 by François Watteau de Lille, oil on canvas (1799).
- Self-Portrait of 1806 by Alexandre Abel de Pujol, oil on canvas.
- The Spaniard by Carolus-Duran, oil on canvas (1870).
- The Reinterment at Montretoux by Jean-Baptiste Carpeaux, oil on canvas (1871).
- Sunset by Jean-Baptiste Carpeaux, oil on canvas (1872).
- Self-Portrait, known as Carpeaux Crying for Sadness by Jean-aptiste Carpeaux, oil on canvas (1874).
- Vallée de l'Aumance by Henri Joseph Harpignies, oil on canvas (1875).
- Nudes in a Landscape by Émile Bernard, oil on canvas (1890).
- Le Duel by Alphonse Chigot, oil on canvas (1908).

== Gallery ==
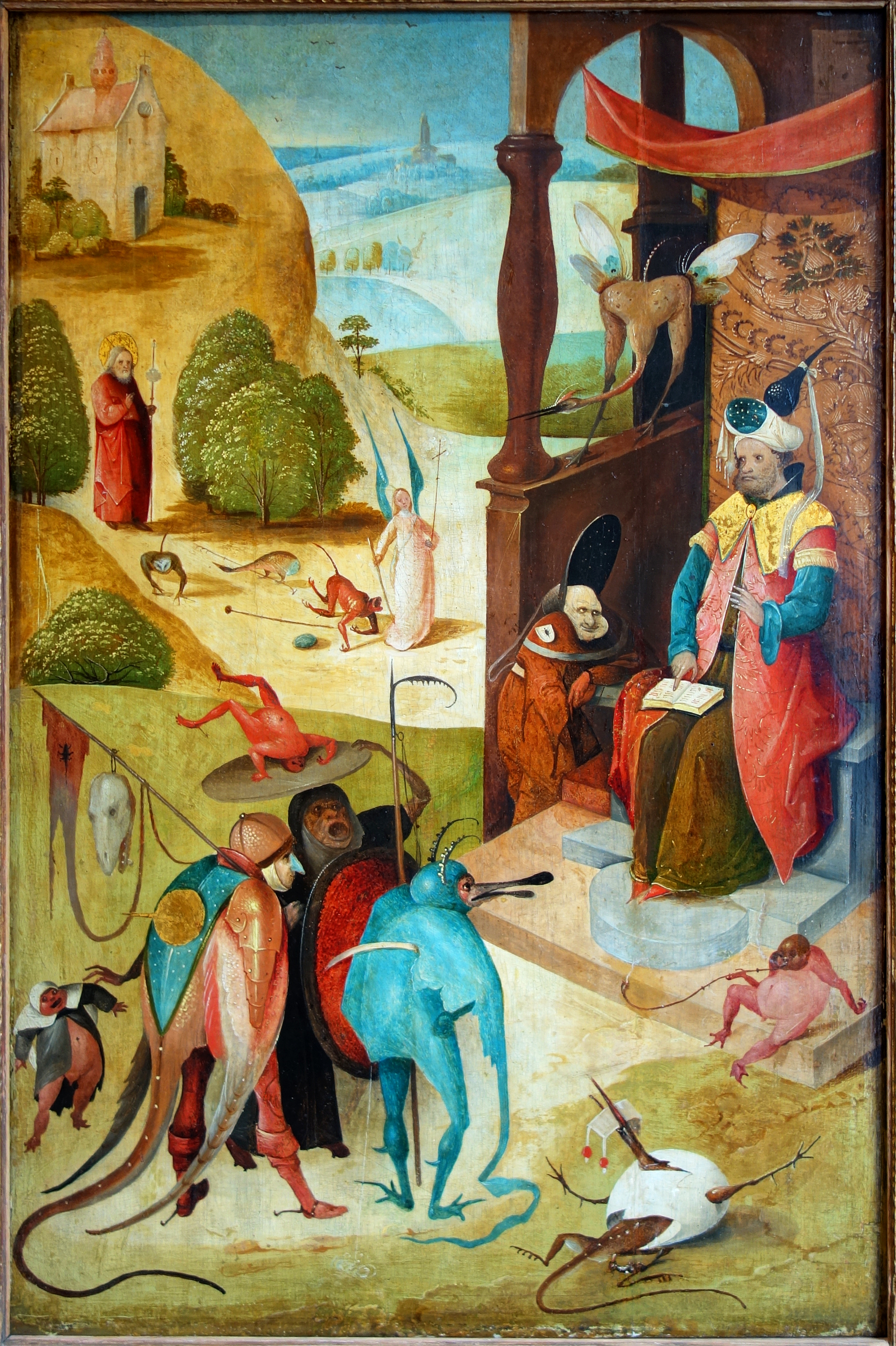
Follower of Hieronymus Bosch, Saint James the Great and the Magician Hermogenes (1550–1575).

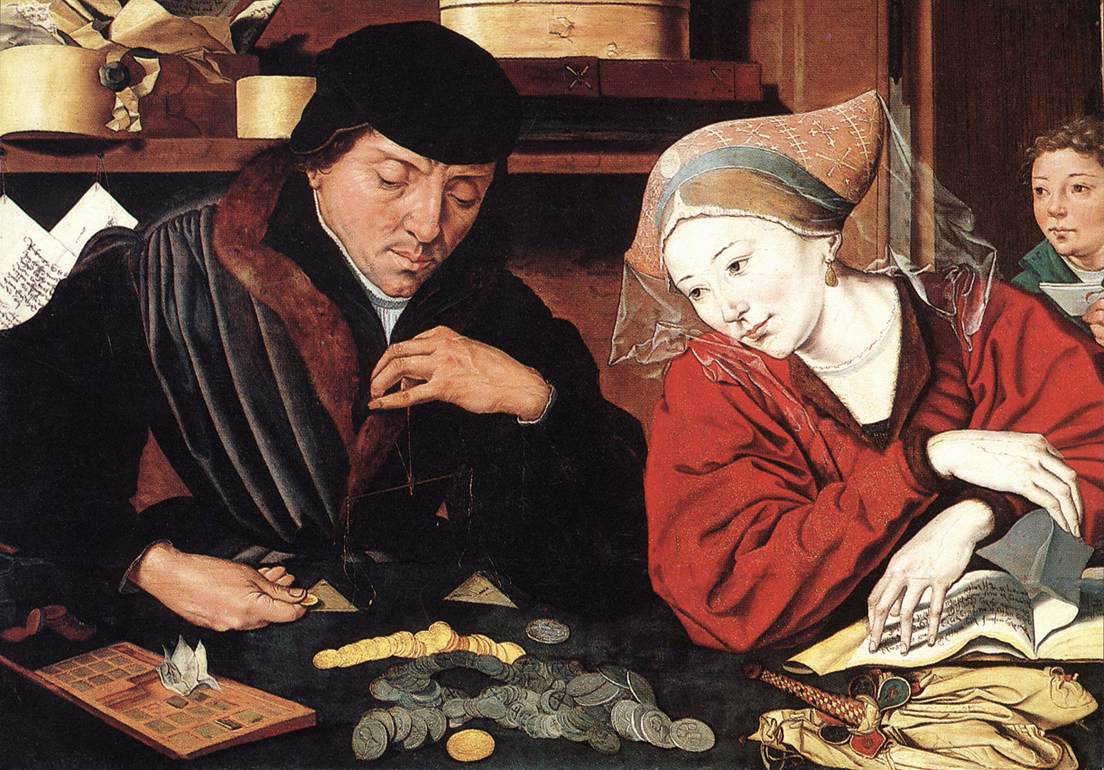
Marinus van Reymerswaele, The Banker and His Wife (1500–1550).

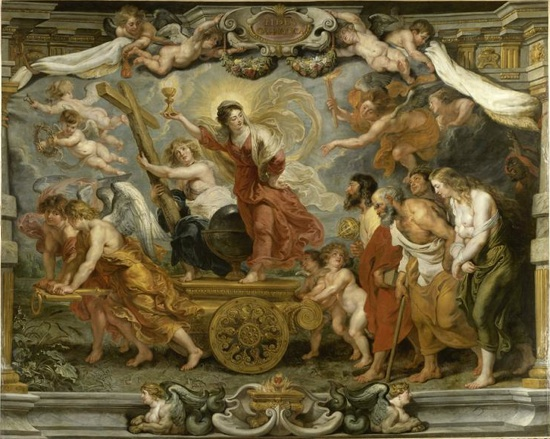
Peter Paul Rubens, The Triumph of the Catholic Faith (1600–1650)

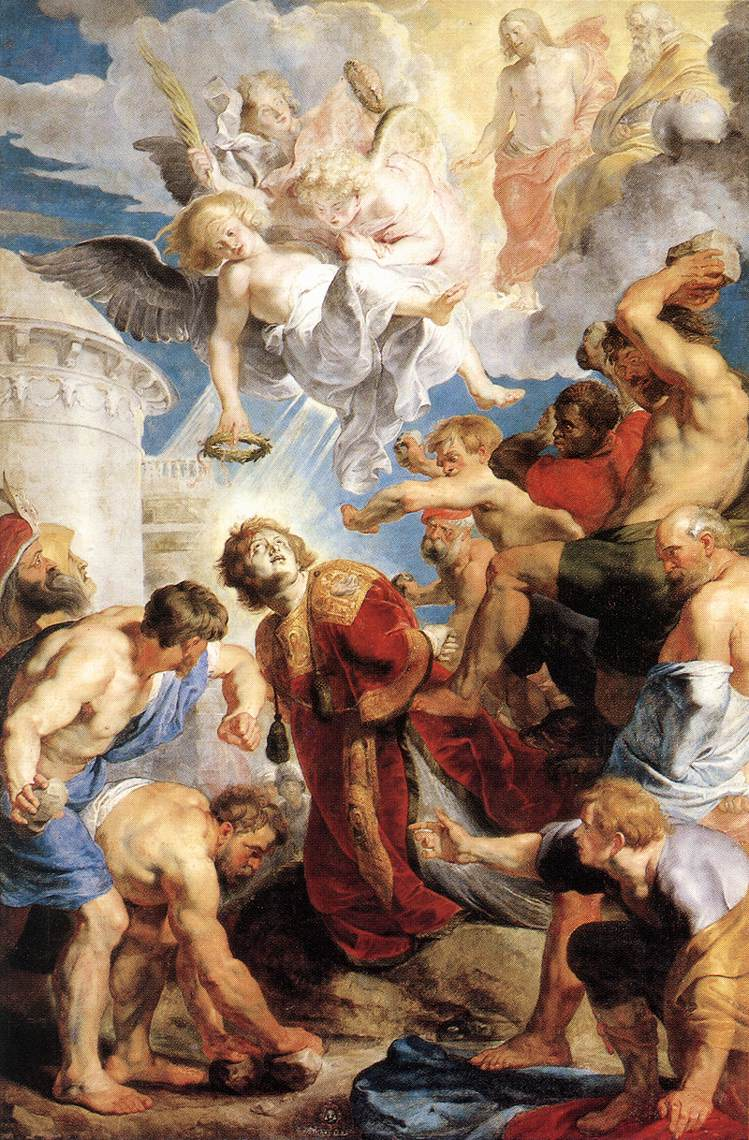
Peter Paul Rubens, The Stoning of St Stephen (1616–1617).

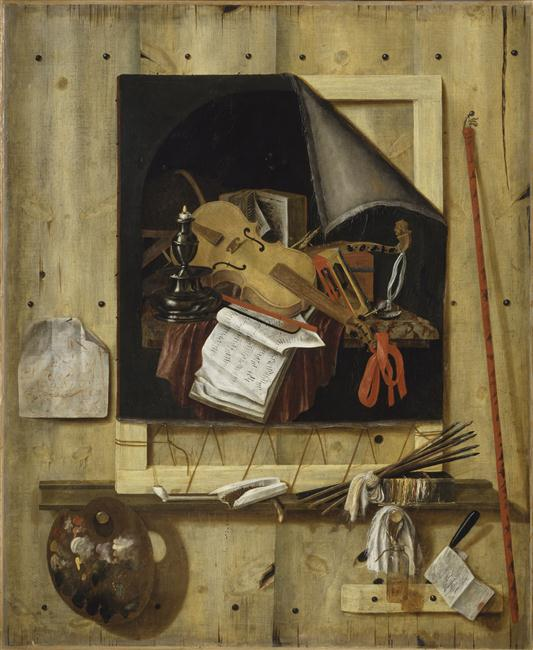
Cornelis Norbertus Gysbrechts, Trompe-l'œil (1665).

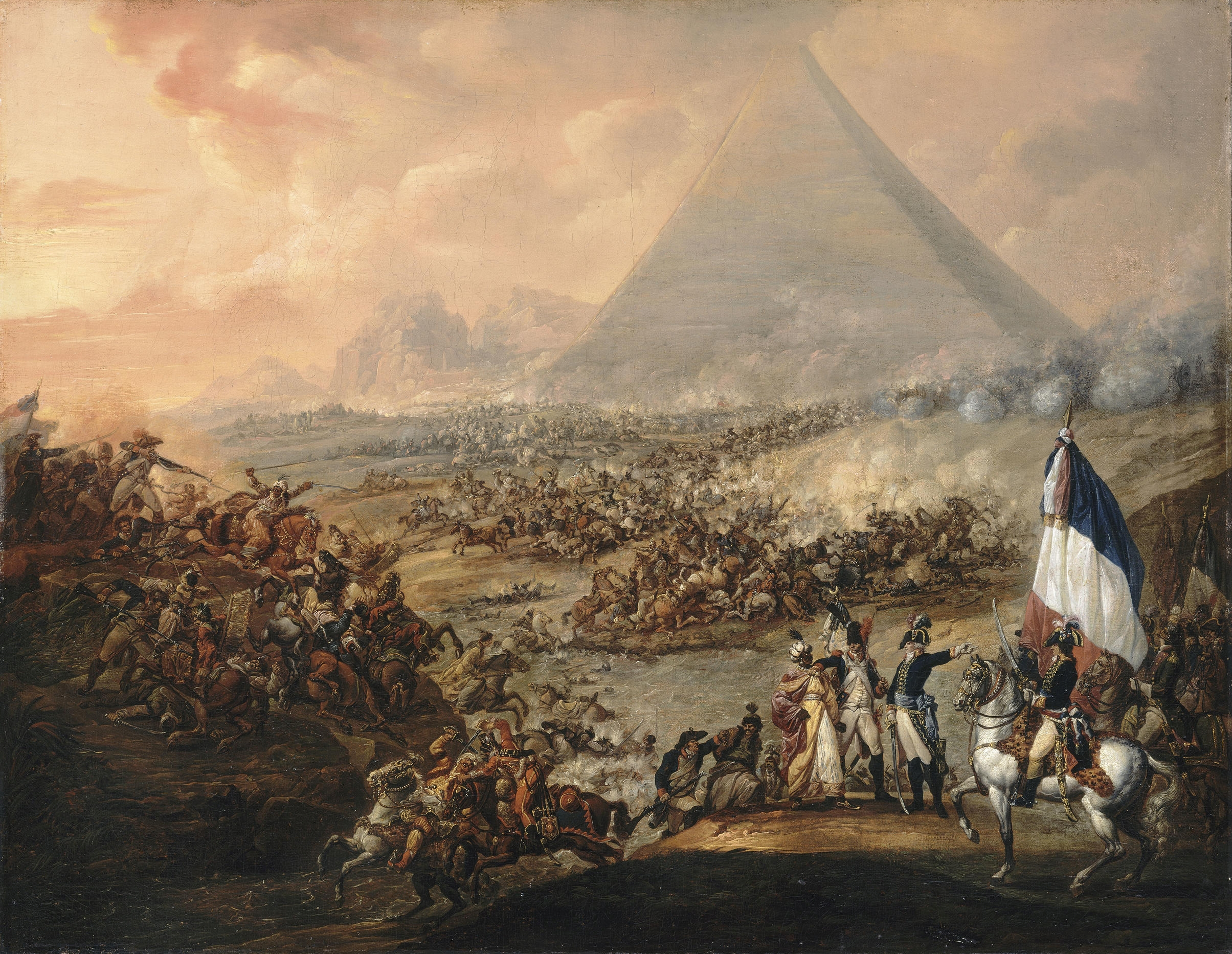
François Watteau, The Battle of the Pyramids (1798–1799).

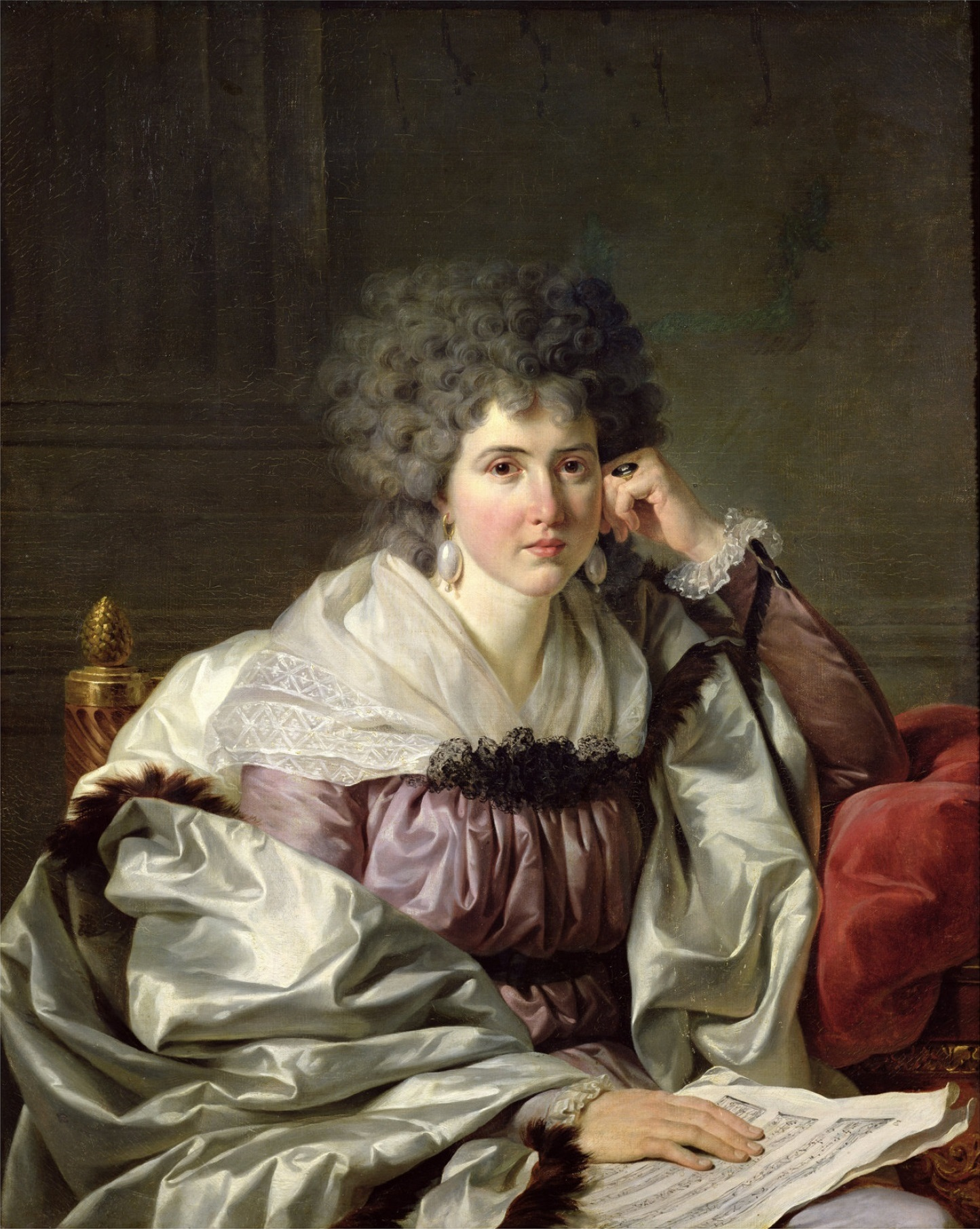
Jean-Charles Nicaise Perrin, Madame Nicaise Perrin, née Catherine Deleuze (c. 1800).

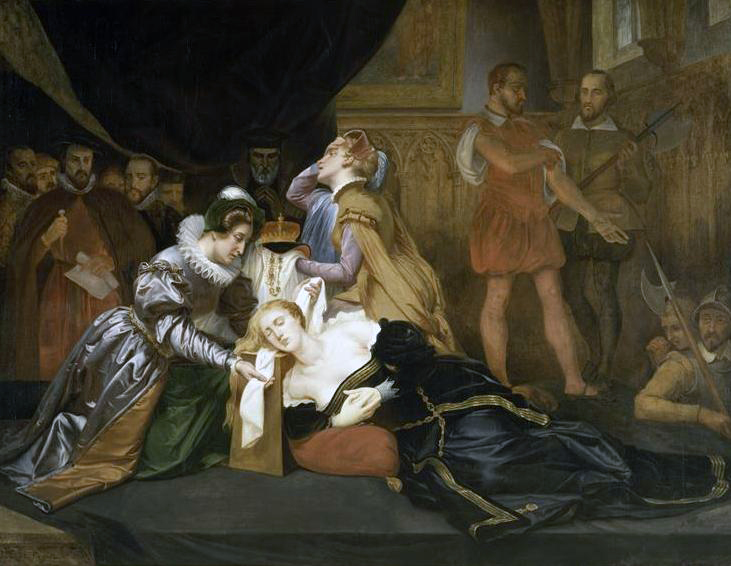
Abel de Pujol, The Death of Mary Queen of Scots, 1587 (1800–1850).

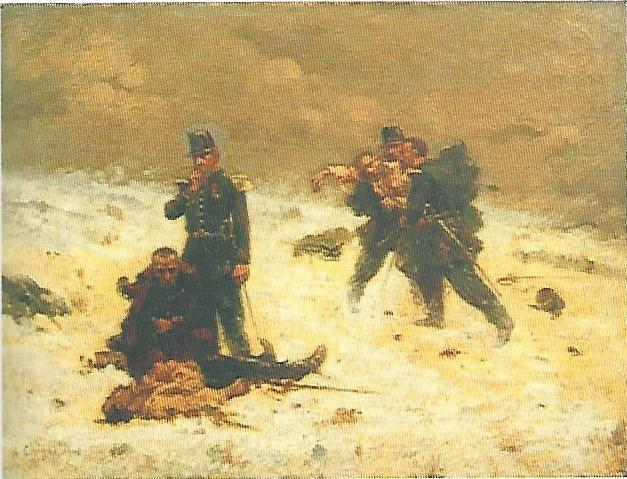
Alphonse Chigot (1824-1917) Le Duel (1909)

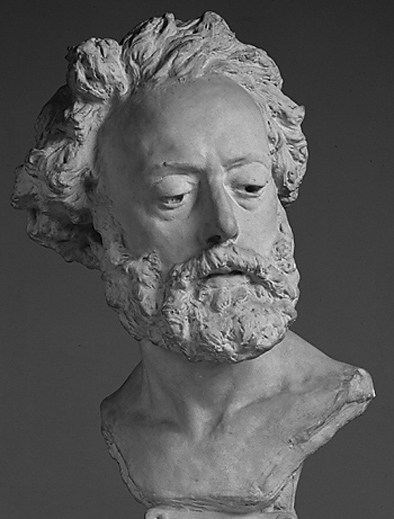
Jean-Baptiste Carpeaux, Bust of Bruno Chérier (1874).

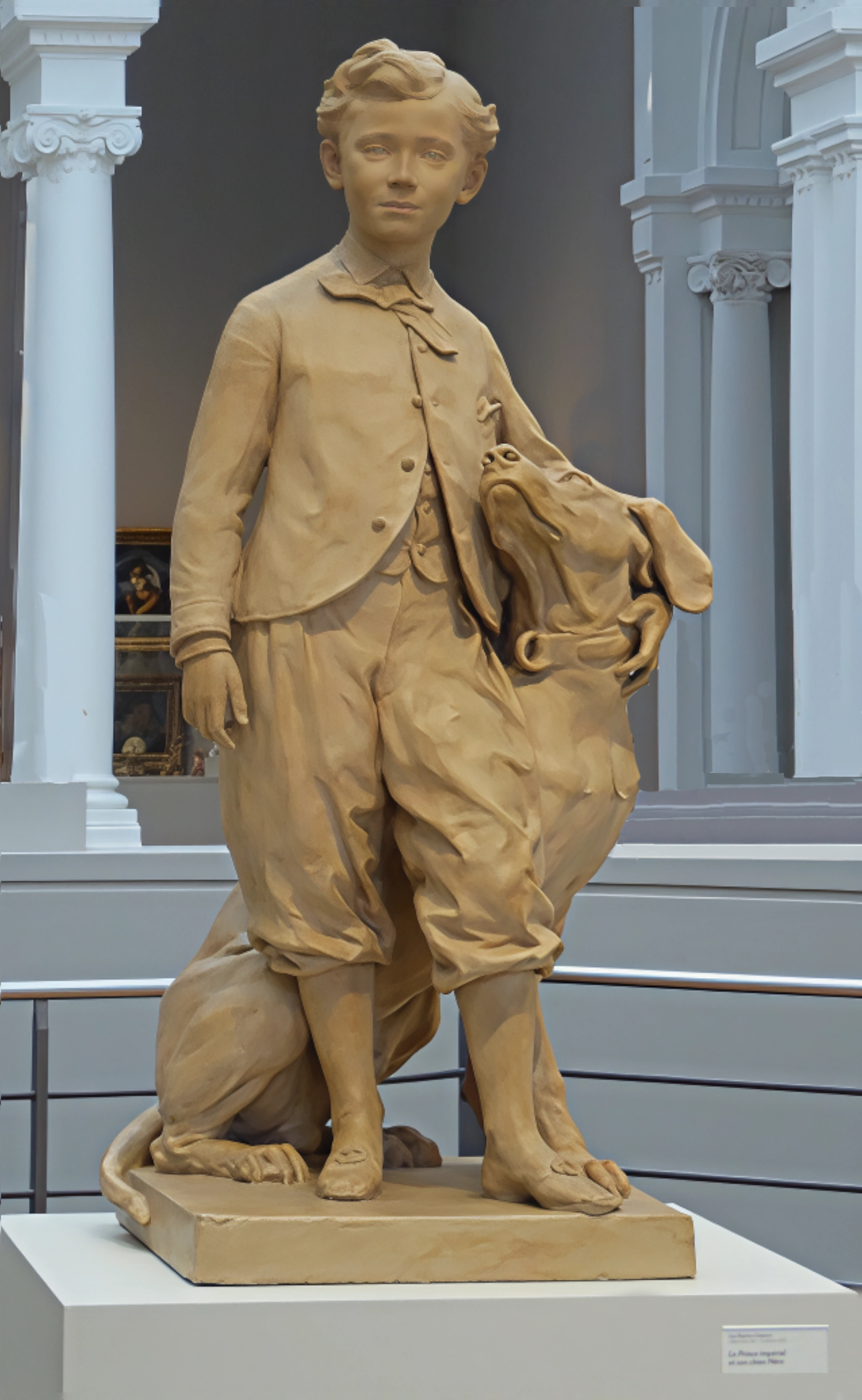
Jean-Baptiste Carpeaux, The Imperial Prince and his dog Nero (1865)
