= Saint Stephen Triptych =

Altarpiece by Peter Paul Rubens

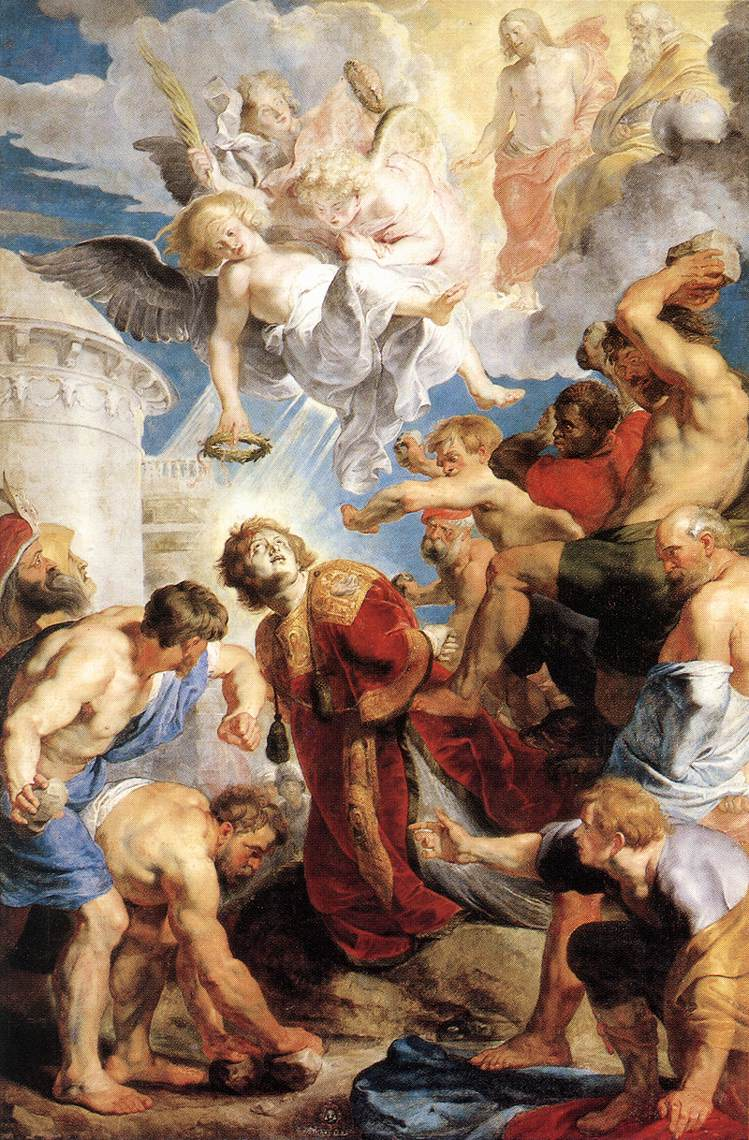
The central panel

The Saint Stephen Triptych is a 1616–1617 oil on panel painting by Peter Paul Rubens, produced as the high altarpiece for Saint-Amand Abbey, a Benedictine house near Valenciennes. It was seized during the French Revolution and is now in the Musée des Beaux Arts de Valenciennes.

The central panel shows The Stoning of Saint Stephen, whilst the main images on the two side panels show The Preaching of Saint Stephen and The Burial of Saint Stephen. When closed, the reverse of the two side panels form an Annunciation scene. Jacob Nicolas Moreau, a traveller during the reign of Louis XV, mentioned the altarpiece, stating "I believed I saw the heavens opened, so much was I struck by the beauty of the colouring and by the freshness of this admirable painting".

== Sources ==
- "Musée des Beaux Arts » Triptyque de Saint Etienne". valenciennesmusee.valenciennes.fr. Archived from the original on 2019-05-08.
