= Meiffren Conte =

French painter

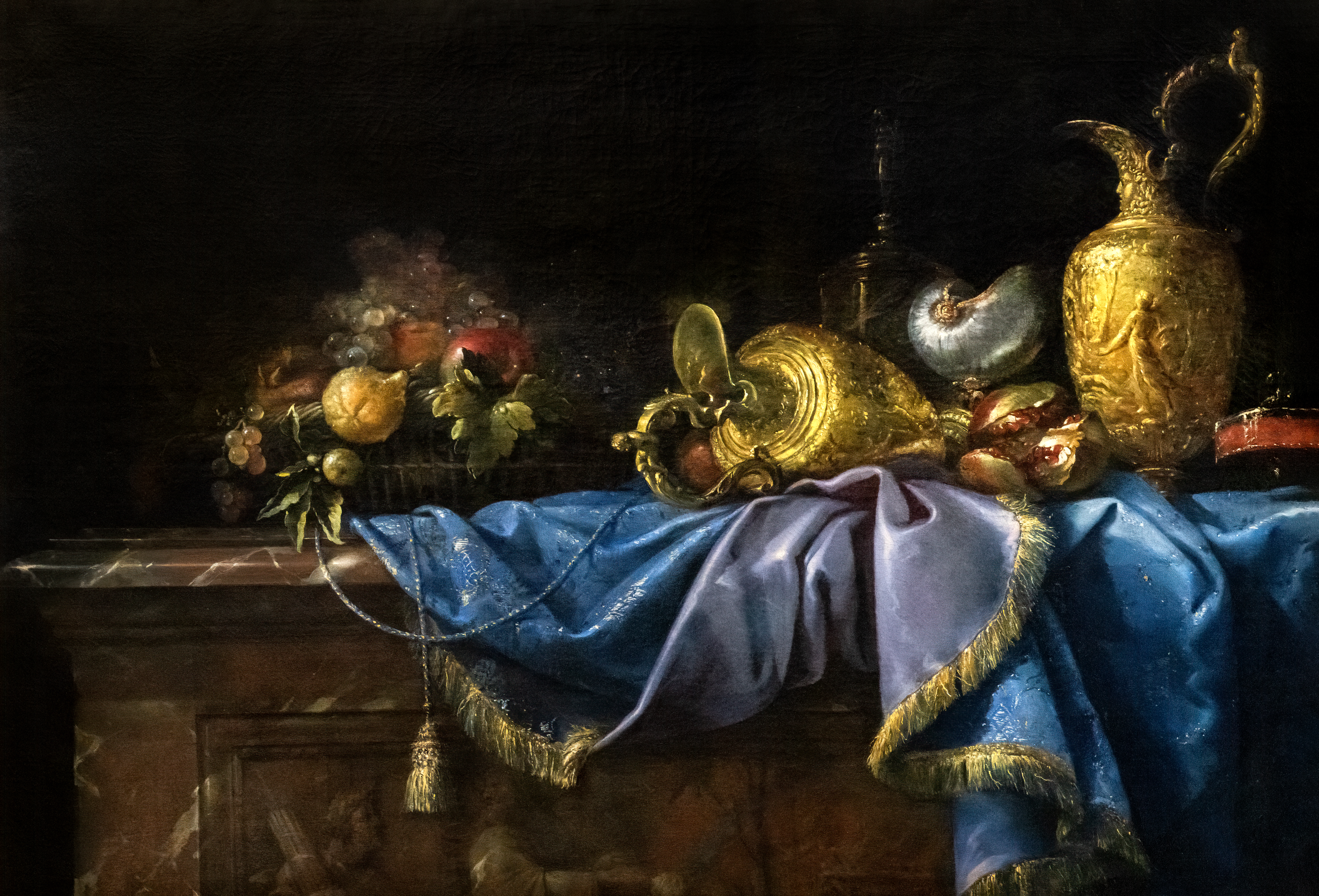
Still life (Musée des Beaux-Arts de Narbonne)

Meiffren Conte or Comte (c.1630 – c.1705) was a French painter. He was born in Marseille, but completed his artistic training in Rome, where he was strongly influenced by the work of Francesco Noletti (1611–1654). He worked in Paris and Aix-en-Provence, before moving back to his hometown, where he died. He is most notable for his still lifes.

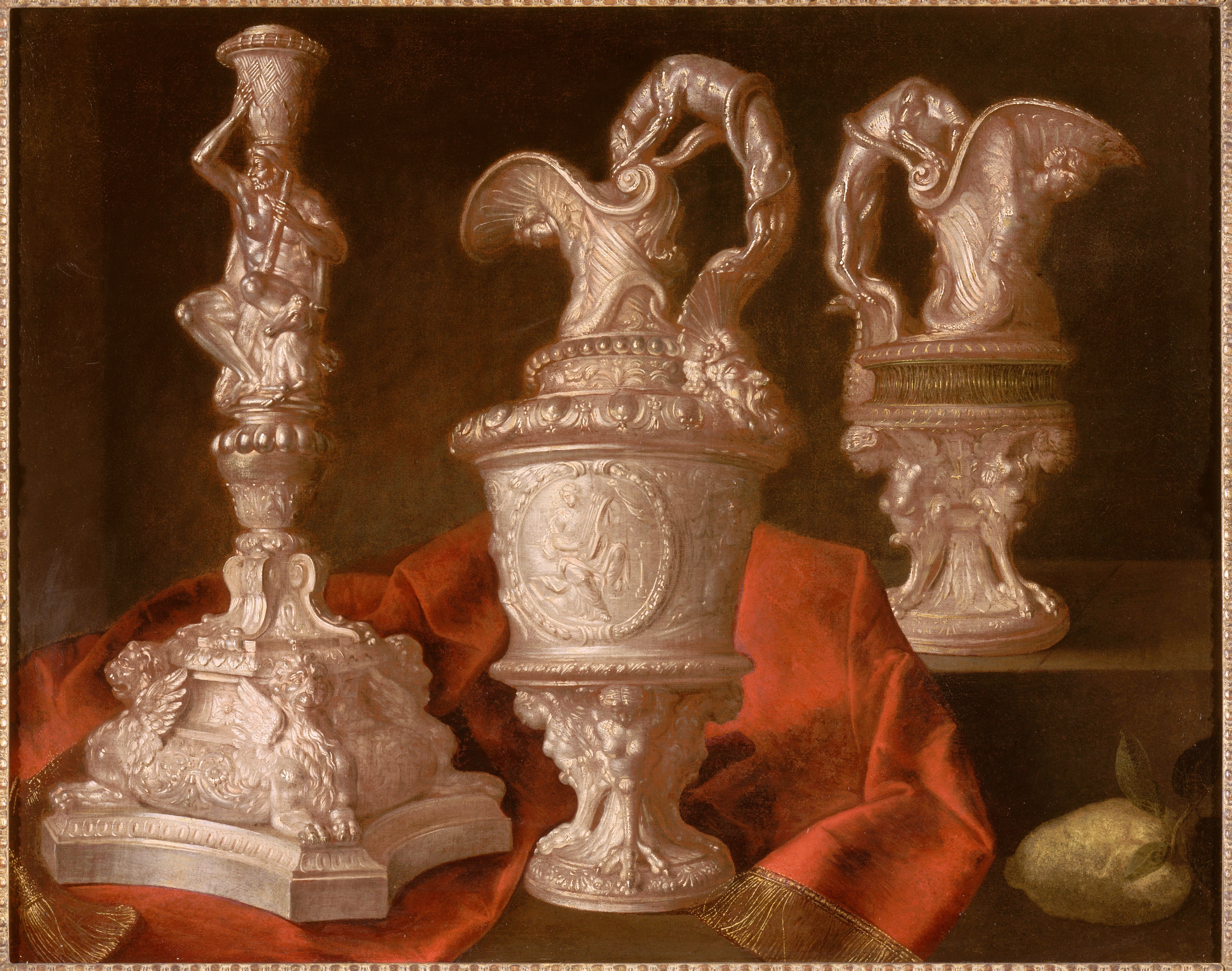
Silver Torch

== Sources ==
- Claude-Gérard Marcus, « Un maître de la nature morte redécouvert : Meiffren Comte, Peintre d'Orfèvrerie », Art et Curiosité, mai 1966.
