= Hospice Comtesse =

Museum of historic hospice in Lille, France

Coordinates: 50°38′28″N 3°03′47″E

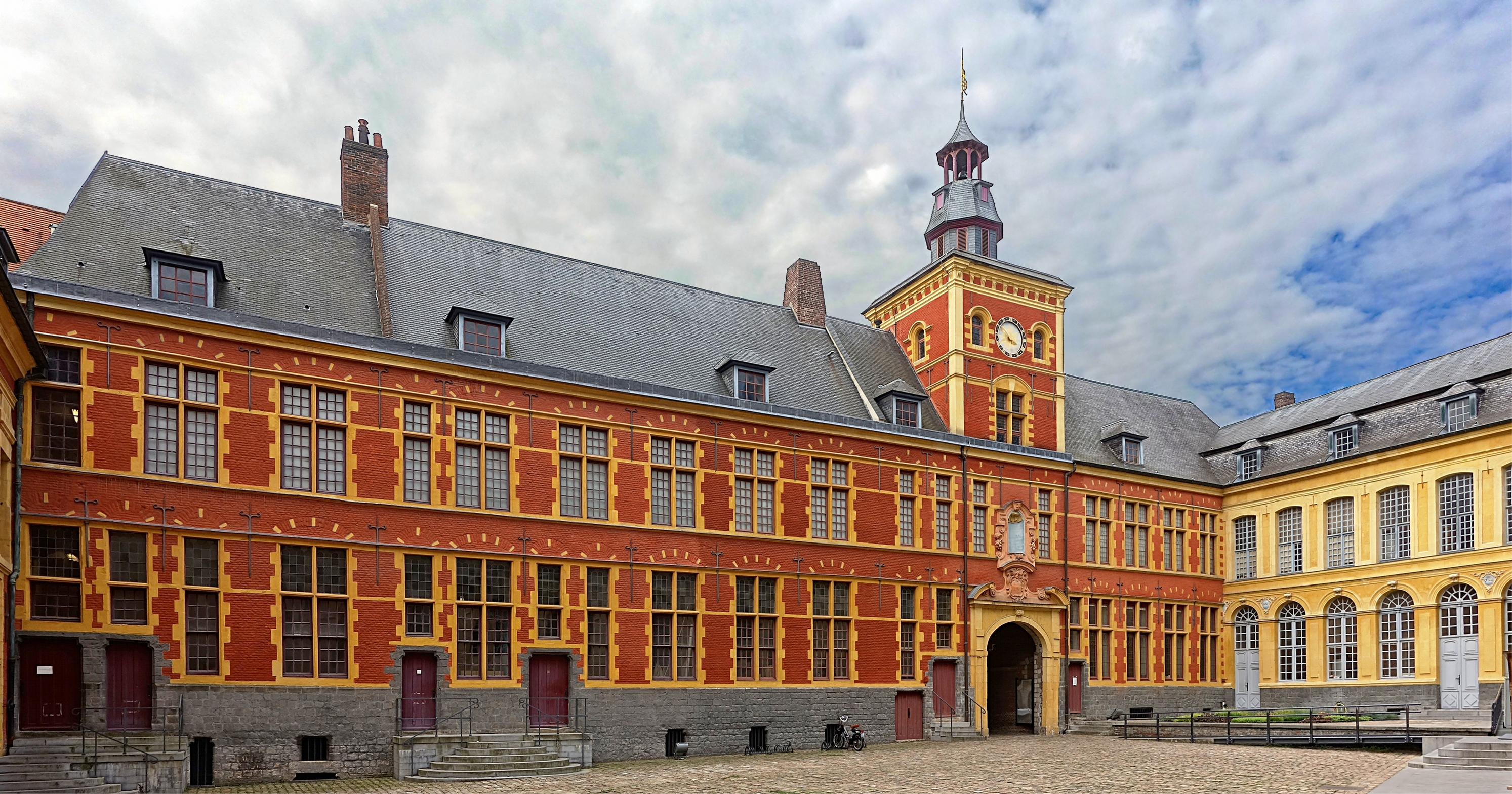
The courtyard of Hospice Comtesse

Exterior facade

The Hospice Comtesse or Hospice Notre-Dame is a 17th-century hospice on Rue de la Monnaie in the Old Town area of Lille, France, first built in 1236 by Joan, Countess of Flanders. It is now a museum on the history of the hospice.

The museum's collections include ceramics, paintings and furniture.
