= Five Row =

- Row House Neighborhood
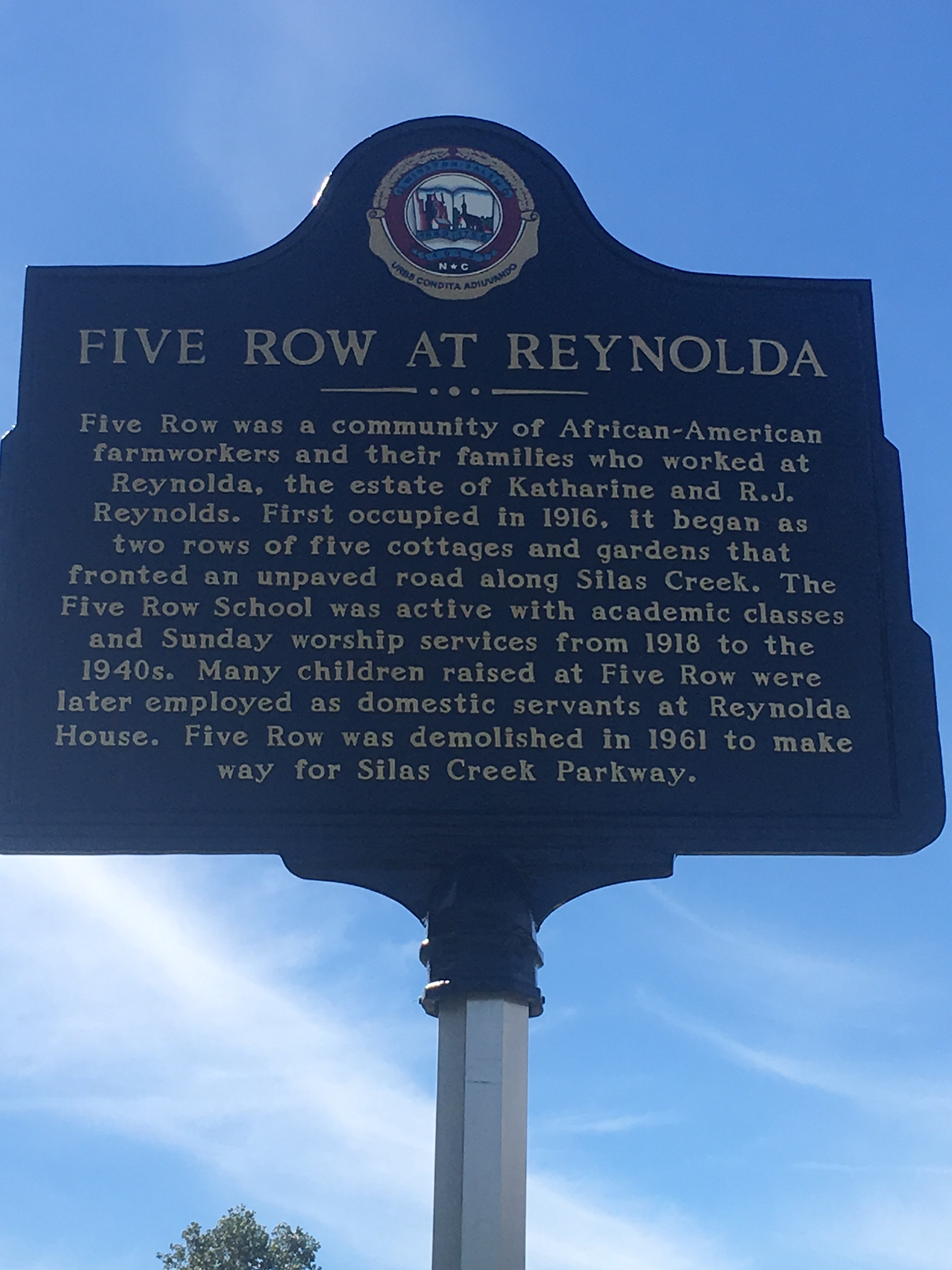
- State: North Carolina
- County: Forsyth
- City: Winston-Salem

Five Row was a community for African American farmhands and their families who worked in the Reynolda Village and Reynolda House in Winston-Salem, North Carolina. It was characterized by two rows of 5 houses as well as a school house that was used on Sundays as a church. This community was situated in the most unattractive part of the estate, despite Reynolds' attempts to improve it. Residents of Five Row did not have the amenities that the rest of the estate possessed, however they had front porches and private hedges with flowers. The community was demolished in 1961 and has since been used for the construction of the city's second highway Silas Creek Parkway.

== Five Row School ==
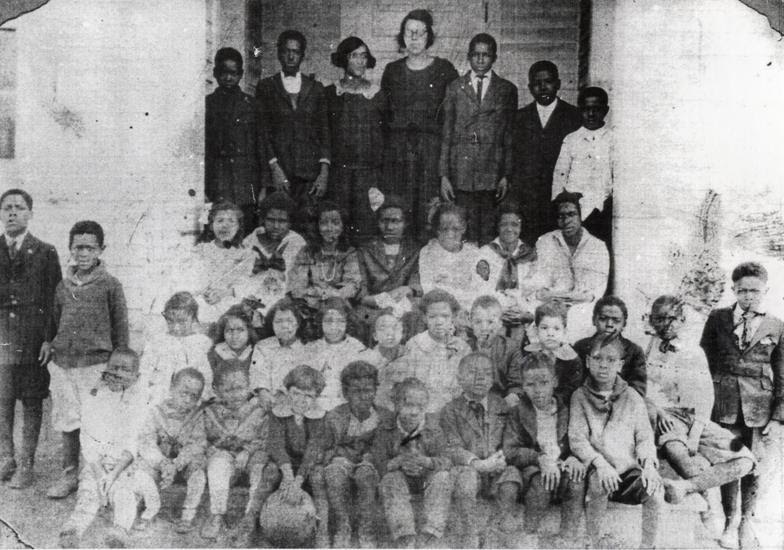
Students and faculty at the Five Row School in Reynolda Village

The Five Row Community had their own school. Lovey Eaton was appointed by Katharine Smith Reynolds as the first teacher at the Five Row School. 60 students attended the school and it was known for its academics. It ran a longer school year, functioning for 8 months instead of 6. Also, though segregated, they used the same textbooks that were used in the local public schools and taught the same subjects. The school was a large building and also served as a church.

== Five Row Legacy ==
The Peppercorn Children's Theatre play, "Growing Up Reynolda," about the residents of Five Row premiered in June 2014. The play depicted the lives and jobs of the residents. The production was written and directed by Harry Poster.

There is an official North Carolina Historical Marker at the old site of the Five Row neighborhood that is now Silas Creek Parkway.
