= Reynolda Village =

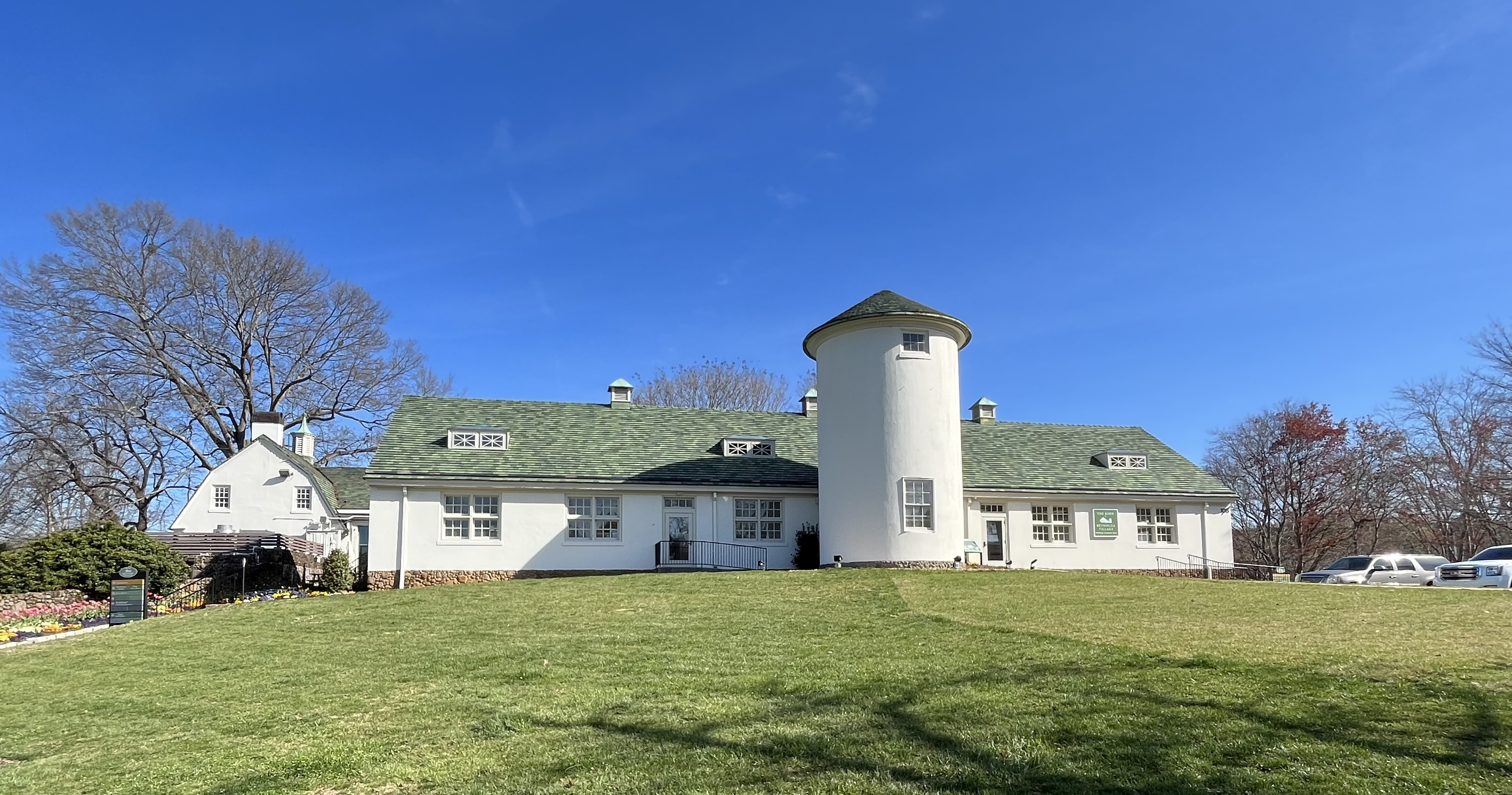
- Reynolda Village's dairy barn, 2023
- Location: Winston-Salem, North Carolina, U.S.
- Coordinates: 36.1248°N 80.2842°W
- Address: 2201 Reynolda Road
- Opened: c. 1916 (110 years ago)
- Owner: Wake Forest University (since 1965)
- Architect: Charles Barton Keen; Willard C. Northup
- Num. of stores: 19 (as of April 2023)
- Website: www.reynoldavillage.com

Reynolda Village is a shopping and business complex in Winston-Salem, North Carolina, created from the servant and agricultural buildings of Reynolda, the former R. J. Reynolds estate. The village, which covers around 13.5 acres (5.5 ha), was planned as a working model farm, designed by Charles Barton Keen and Willard C. Northup in the early 20th century. It is now part of Reynolda Historic District, with twenty-two of its buildings, and one other contributing structure, now listed on the National Register of Historic Places.

Each building is constructed of matte green Ludowici-Celadon tile, cedar shingles painted green or asbestos shingles. The white exterior walls are mostly stucco on metal lathe, with a few having horizontal clapboard siding. The more substantial structures were built from fieldstone collected from the estate. The cattle shed, corn crib and chicken house were reconstructed in 1978 and 1979.

At present, the village is owned and operated by nearby Wake Forest University (to which it was deeded in 1965), as is the adjacent Reynolda Gardens. Reynolda Church stands directly across Reynolda Road, on Brookfield Drive, from the village's main entrance. (The village can also be accessed, via a one-way road, from the entrance to Reynolda House, further south on Reynolda Road.)

== Constituent buildings ==
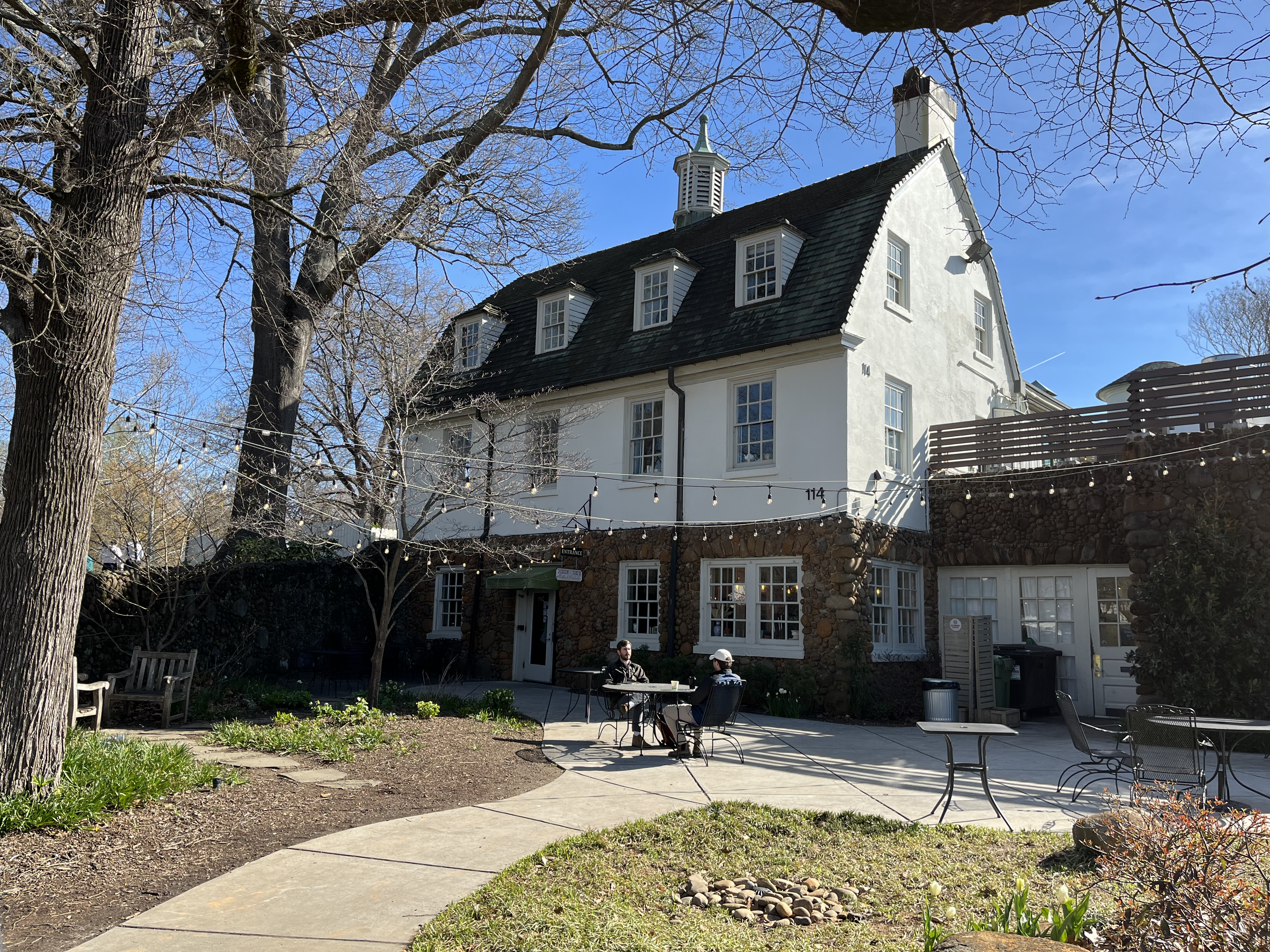
The current home of Dough-Joe's Doughnuts and Coffee, formerly the village's main barn

Buildings which once served as dairy barns, cattle sheds and servants' stores and cottages have now been converted into shops, restaurants and office spaces. A selection of these thirty or so buildings include:

Number	Building	Occupant as of May 2024
99	Treasurer's Cottage	Norman Stockton
100	Reynolda Gardens of Wake Forest University	Garden Boutique
101	—	Aeracura Salon
102	Servant's Cottage	Corporate Office
104	Post Office	All Through the House
106	Dairy Barns	The Barn at Reynolda
107	—	Gazebo
111	Cattle Shed	Wm. McCalls children's clothing store Ringmaster Jewelers Sfeer + Co.
113	—	May Way Dumplings
114	Main Barn	Dough-Joe's Doughnuts and Coffee Theodore's Bar and Market Village Hair Designs Painters' Palette Village Fabric Shop Pure Barre Half Past Three
116	Chauffeur's Cottage	European Touch Day Spa
117	Smokehouse	J.McLaughlin Naturopathic Health Clinic
118	Stenographer's Cottage	Vacant
119	Plumber's Cottage (moved from the grounds of Reynolda Church in 1979)	Uncorked Masterpiece Village Realty
120	Central power and heating plant	A Proper View The Bookhouse
122	Blacksmith's	Start Gallery Penny Path Cafe & Crepe Shop
128	—	Vacant
217	Horticulturist's Cottage	Monkee's
221	Head Dairyman's Cottage	Village Tavern
—	Five Row School
—	Carriage House
—	Schoolmaster's Cottage
—	Poultryman's Cottage

Each cottage had its own laundry yard and garden, enclosed by latticework and gates. Four of the resident cottages were still used as such in the 1980 assessment of the village for its nomination to the National Register of Historic Places.

The former farmhouse was used as a men's boarding house until the outbreak of World War II.

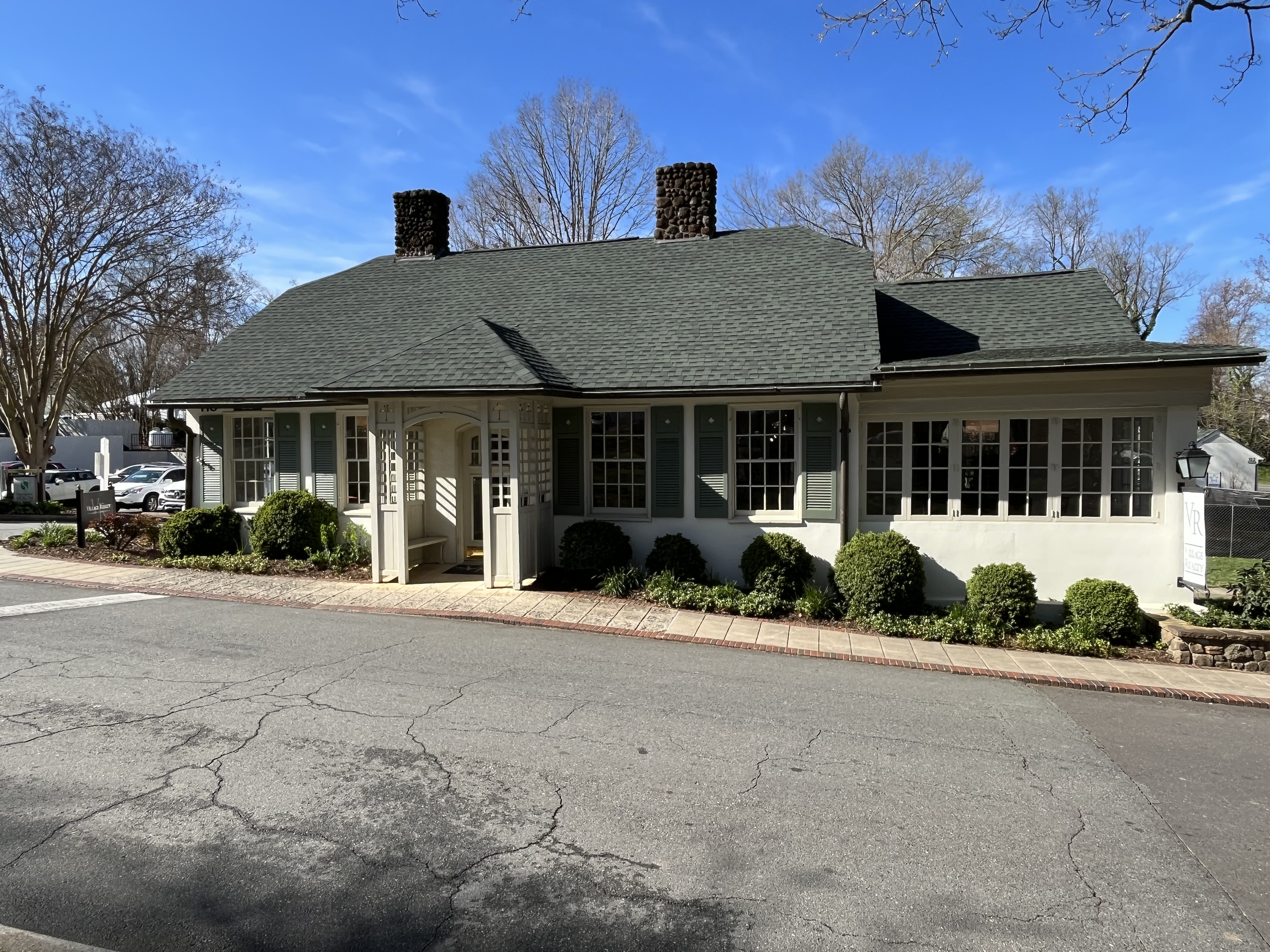
Plumber's Cottage

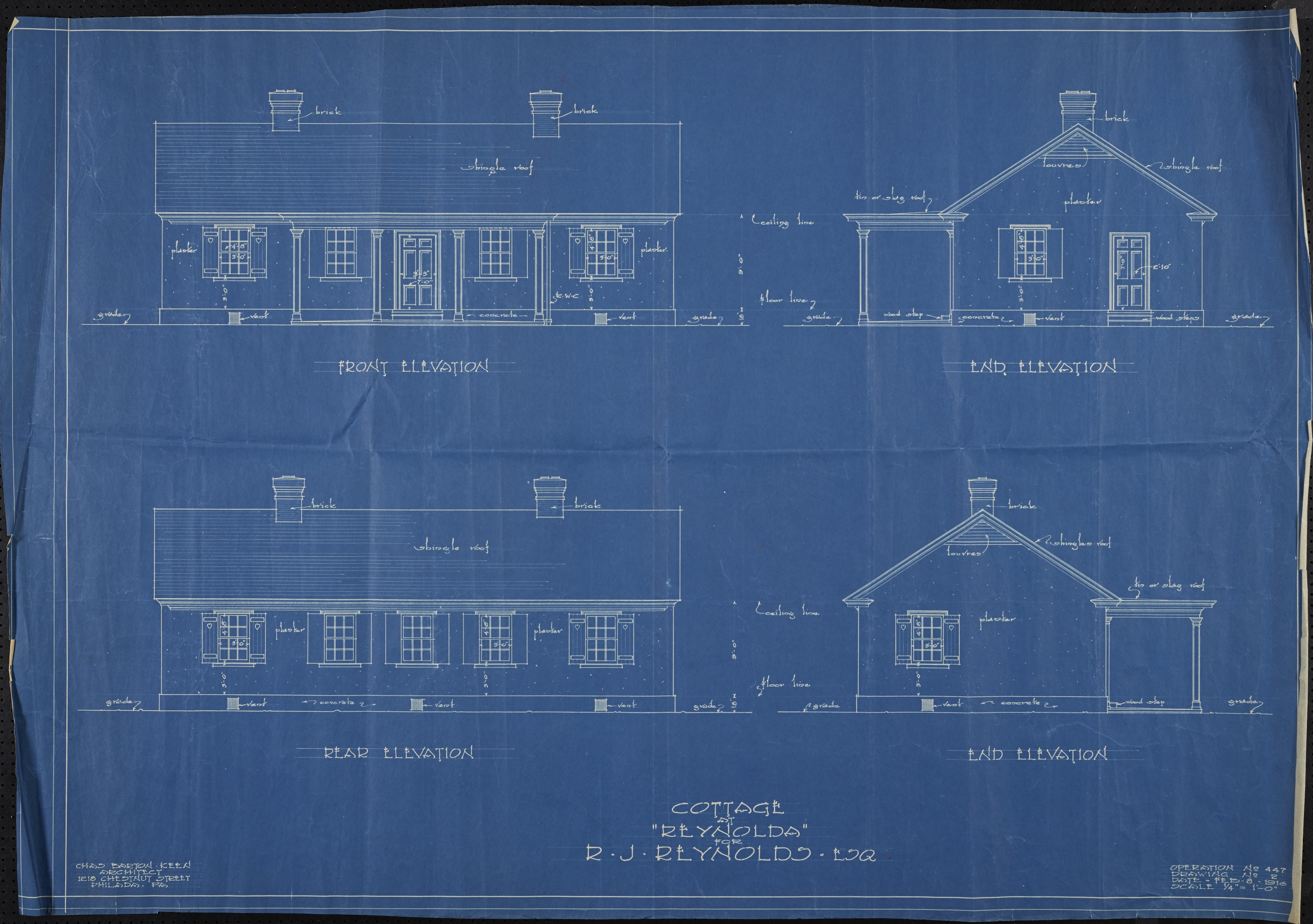
Architectural designs for the front, end and rear elevation of the blacksmith's cottage

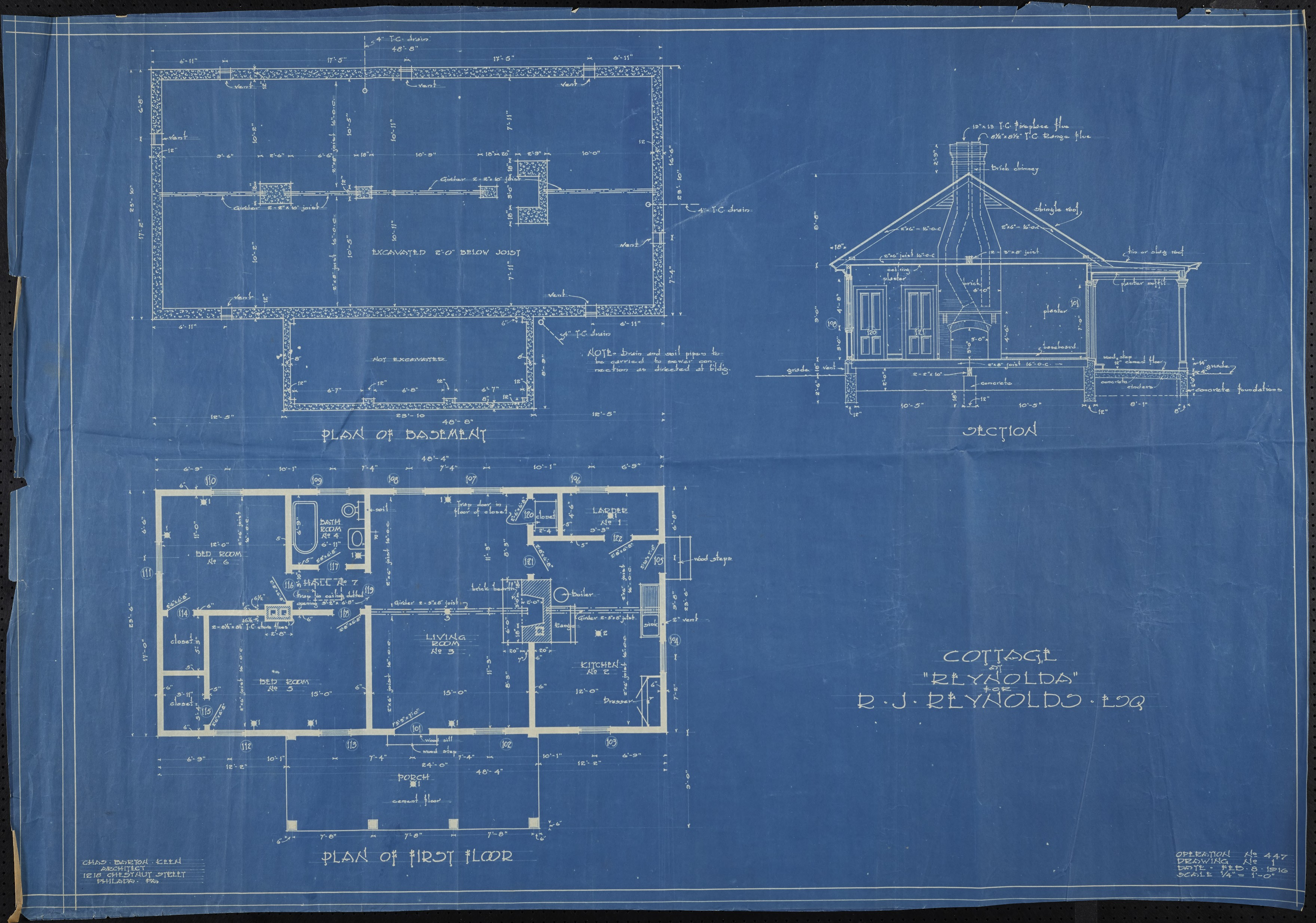
The floor plan of the basement and first floor of the blacksmith's cottage
