= R. J. Reynolds (disambiguation) =

R. J. Reynolds may refer to:

- R. J. Reynolds (1850-1918), American businessman and tobacconist
- R. J. Reynolds Jr. (1906–1964), American entrepreneur, son of the above
- R. J. Reynolds Tobacco Company, tobacco company founded in 1874 by R. J. Reynolds
- R. J. Reynolds Memorial Auditorium, in Winston-Salem, North Carolina
- Richard J. Reynolds High School, also in Winston-Salem, North Carolina
- R. J. Reynolds (baseball), former Major League Baseball player for the Los Angeles Dodgers and Pittsburgh Pirates
