= Reynolda Historic District =

Historic district in North Carolina, United States

- U.S. National Register of Historic Places
- U.S. Historic district
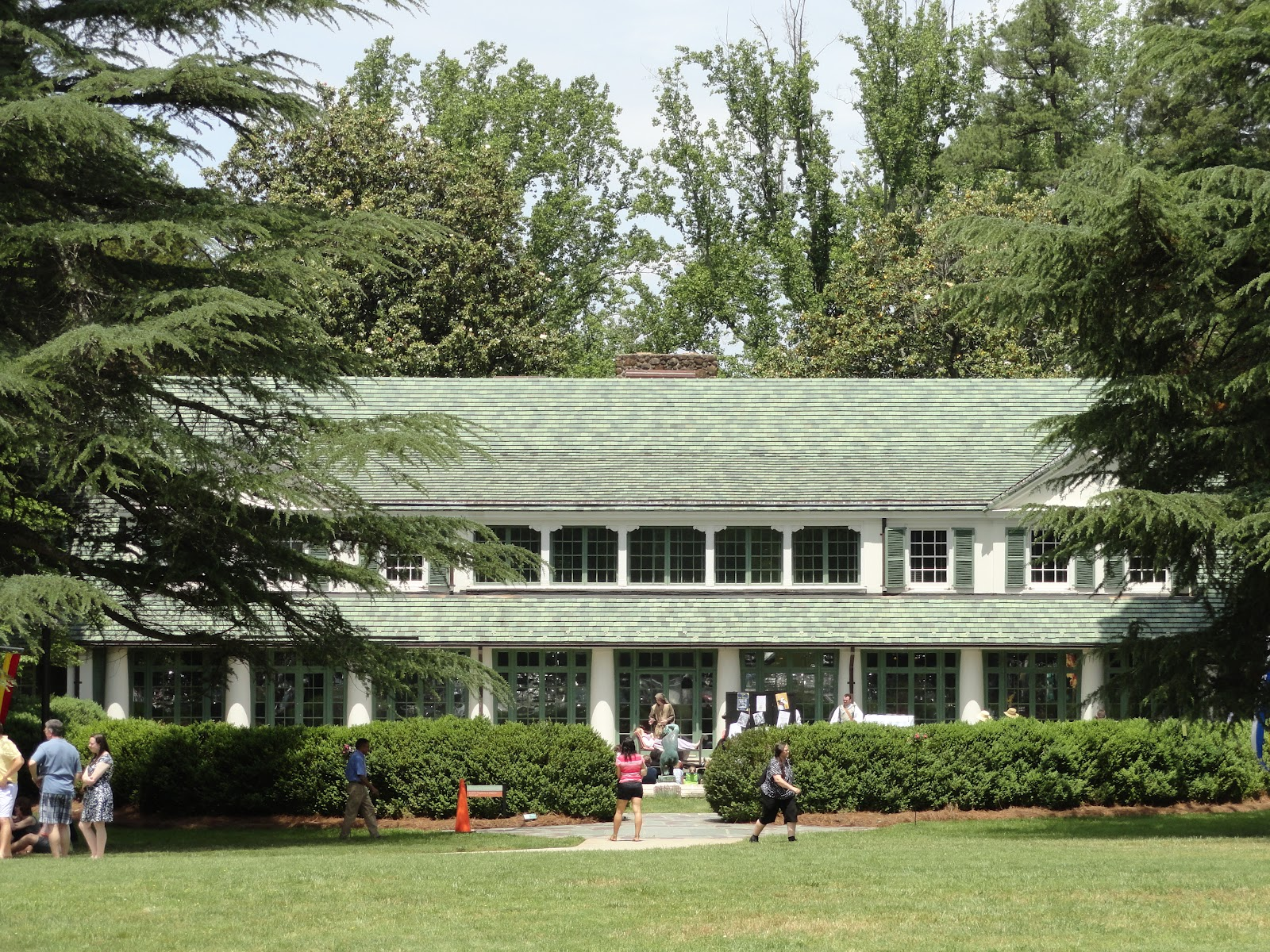
- Reynolda House, 2012

- Location within North Carolina Location within the United States
- Location: Reynolda Road, Winston-Salem, North Carolina, U.S.
- Coordinates: 36°07′37″N 80°16′52″W
- Area: 178 acres (72 ha)
- Architects: Charles Barton Keen; Thomas Warren Sears
- Architectural style: Bungalow/craftsman, mixed (more than two styles from different periods)
- NRHP reference No.: 80002833
- Added to NRHP: November 28, 1980

Reynolda Historic District is a 178 acres (72 ha) national historic district located on Reynolda Road in Winston-Salem, North Carolina. It includes work by Charles Barton Keen and by landscape architect Thomas Warren Sears. The listing includes twenty-two contributing buildings and one other contributing structure. It includes Reynolda House, Reynolda Gardens, Reynolda Village, and Reynolda Presbyterian Church. The district was once part of a larger, self-sufficient country estate conceived and developed by R. J. Reynolds, founder of the R. J. Reynolds Tobacco Company. The district is adjacent to the Wake Forest University campus. The namesake road goes through the Reynolda Historic District, with Silas Creek Parkway bypassing it.

It was listed on the National Register of Historic Places in 1980.

== Gallery ==
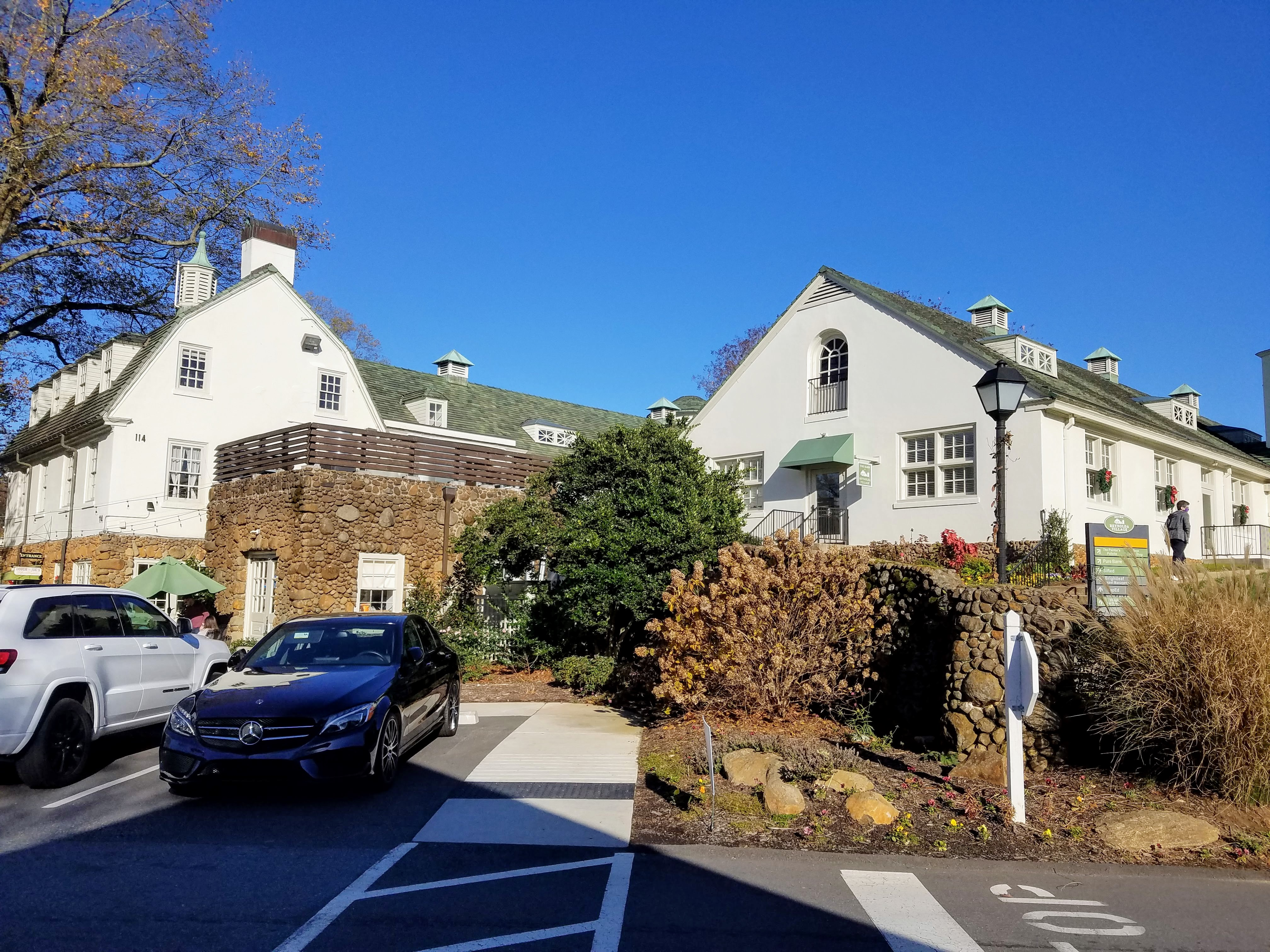
Main Barn and Cow Barn, 2019

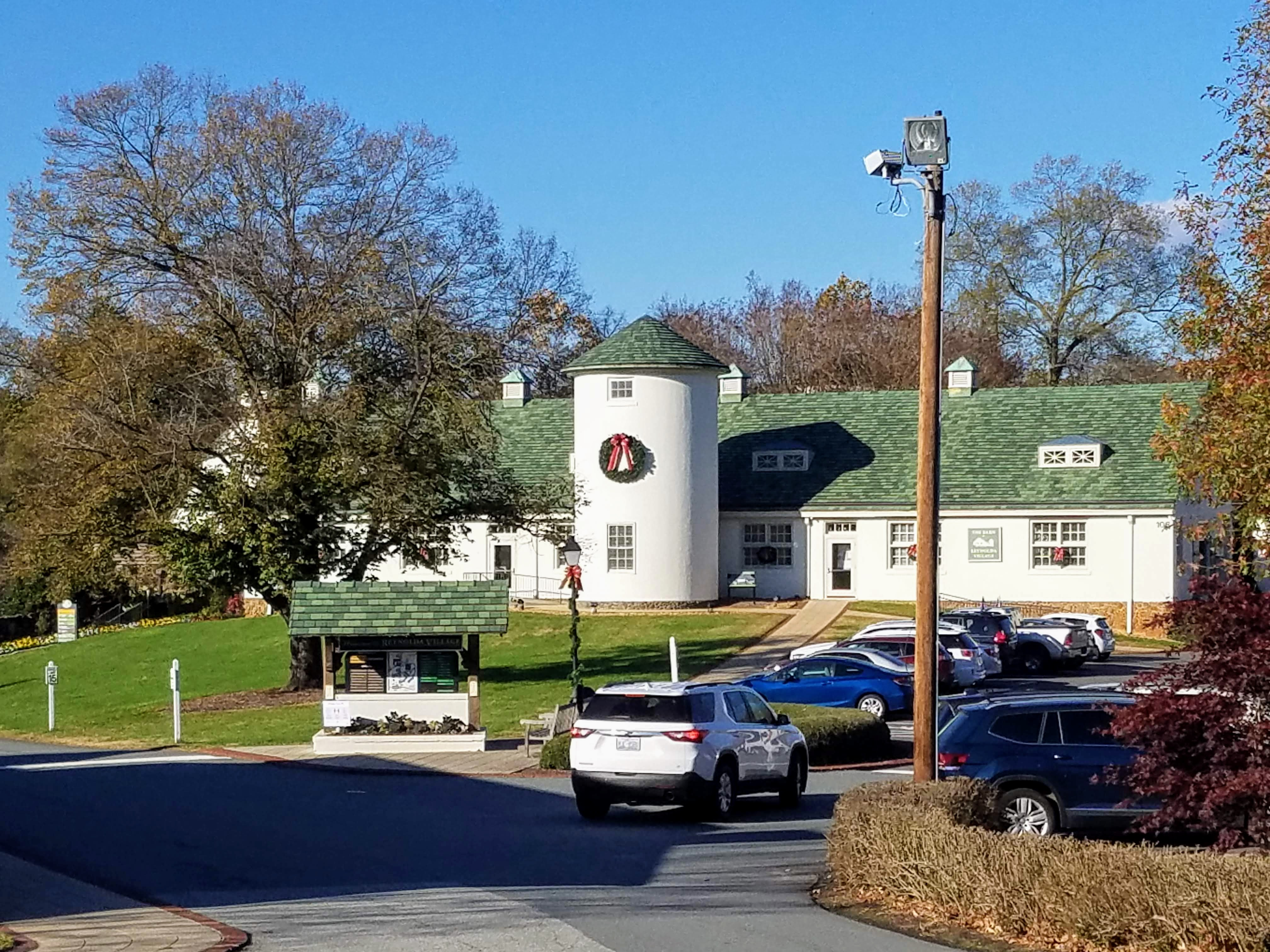
Cow Barn, 2019
