= Graylyn =

Historic house in North Carolina, United States

- U.S. National Register of Historic Places

- Location within North Carolina Location within the United States
- Location: Reynolda Rd., Winston-Salem, North Carolina
- Coordinates: 36°07′07″N 80°17′00″W
- Area: 87 acres (35 ha)
- Built: 1927–32
- Architects: Lashmit, Luther, et al.
- Architectural style: Norman Revival
- NRHP reference No.: 78001949
- Added to NRHP: August 3, 1978

Graylyn Estate is a historic estate located in Winston-Salem, North Carolina. It was listed on the National Register of Historic Places in 1978. The construction of the Norman-style mansion began in 1928. Associated with the house are a number of contributing outbuildings including a garage-guest house and "farm" complex. Today, Graylyn Estate is used as a conference center and hotel. It is currently a member of Historic Hotels of America, the official program of the National Trust for Historic Preservation.

In 2026, in the build-up to the FIFA World Cup, the Germany national football team stayed at Gralyn, while also using the facilities of Wake Forest University for their training needs.

== History ==
=== Construction ===
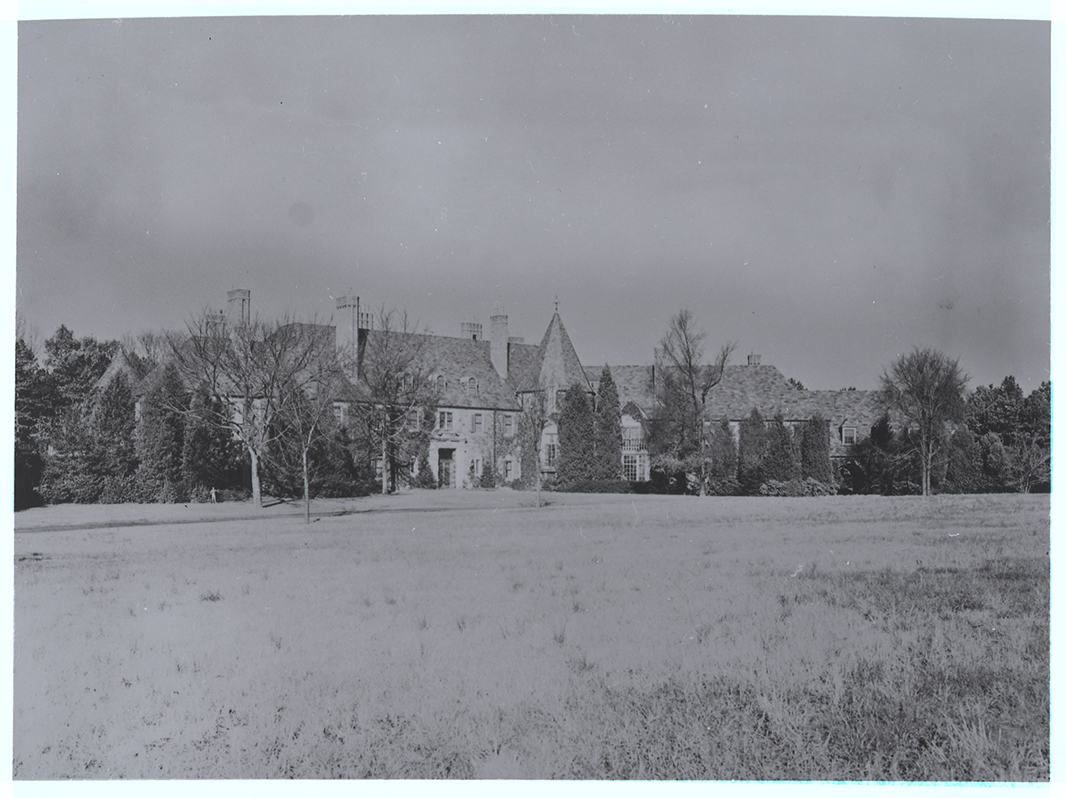
Graylyn Estate circa 1932

In 1925, the R. J. Reynolds Tobacco Company chairman Bowman Gray Sr. and his wife Nathalie Lyons Gray and purchased an 87-acre parcel from R. J. Reynolds with the plan of building “the home of their dreams.” The land had formerly been corn fields and pasture for Reynolds' Reynolda estate, which is now referred to as the Reynolda Historic District.

The groundbreaking for the mansion took place on January 15, 1928, and as many as 136 artisans and craftsmen from all over the United States worked on the construction of the estate at one time. The Norman-style mansion contained approximately 60 rooms. At the time, it was second to George Vanderbilt's Biltmore Estate in Asheville, North Carolina, as the largest private home in the state.

The ironwork throughout the property was designed by Joseph Barton Benson, an ironsmith from Philadelphia. Nathalie Gray personally decorated the rooms of Graylyn, and the grounds and gardens were designed by Thomas Warren Sears. The amenities of the house were considered very lavish at the time, and its original telephone and floodlight systems "were at the cutting end of technology for the 1930s."

=== Later uses ===
Nathalie Gray and her sons gifted the estate to the Bowman Gray School of Medicine in 1946. The estate was used as a psychiatric hospital from 1947 to 1959. Gordon Gray, the son of Nathalie and Bowman Gray, bought the estate back in 1972 and donated it to Wake Forest University. In the following years, the estate was used for multiple purposes including university programs and community service. From 1977 to 1980, Graylyn was used as a dormitory and housed approximately 40 students a year.

=== Fire and reconstruction ===
On June 20, 1980, a fire started in the house during a performance on the lawn by the Winston-Salem Symphony. Nearly 7,000 people watched as the fire extensively damaged the interior of the house. The following day, James R. Scales, the president of Wake Forest University at the time, announced that Graylyn would be rebuilt and restored to its 1932 appearance. The restoration of the mansion and Bernard Cottage was completed in 1984 at a cost of $6,000,000.

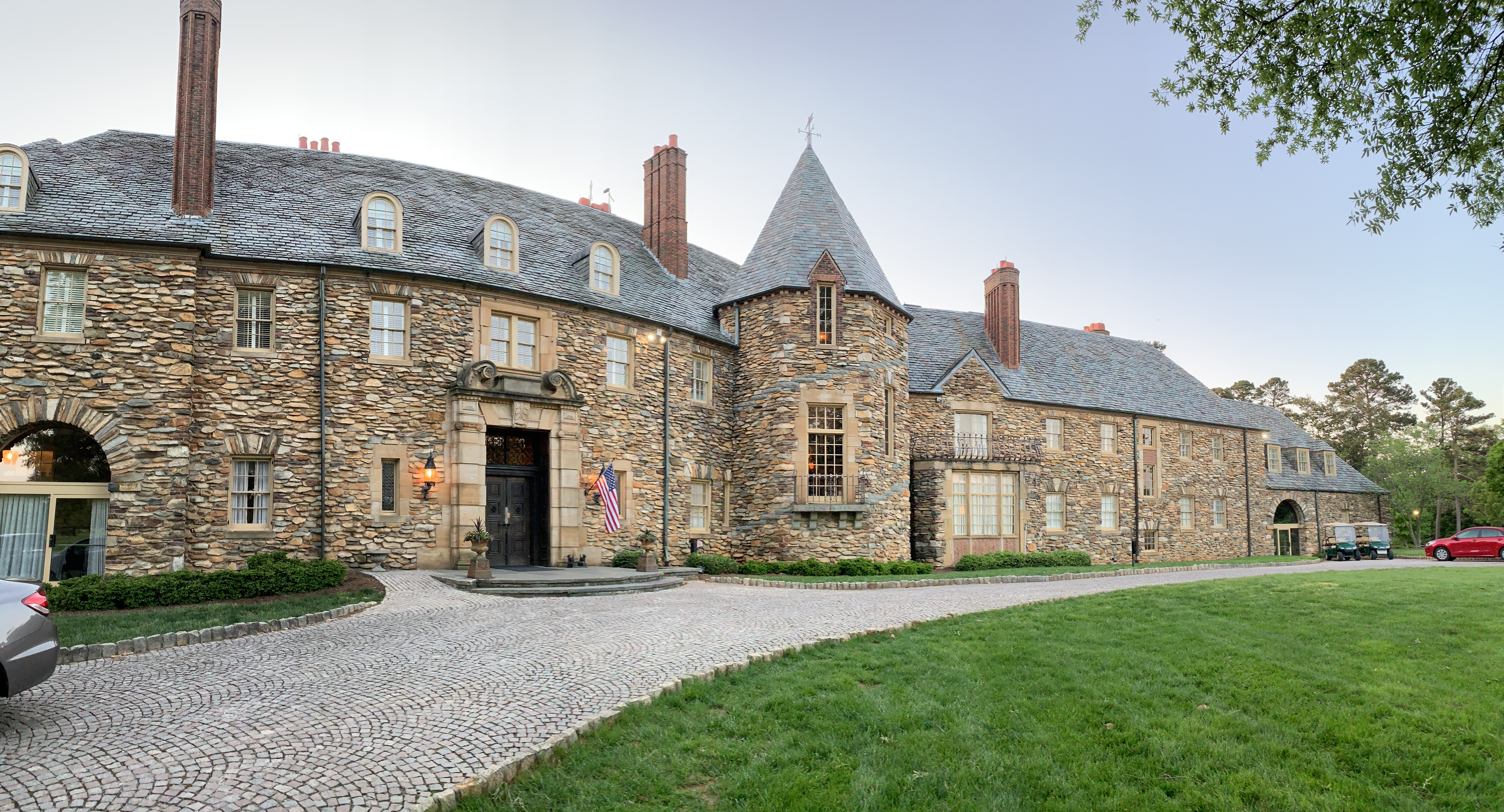
Pictured in 2019

== Current usage ==
Graylyn is currently used as a conference center and contains 85 guest rooms and fifteen meeting rooms. Graylyn has five separate buildings for guest accommodations: the Manor House, the Mews, Bernard Cottage, Gardener's Cottage and the Bungalows.
