= R. J. Reynolds Memorial Auditorium =

Coordinates: 36.1018°N 80.2654°W

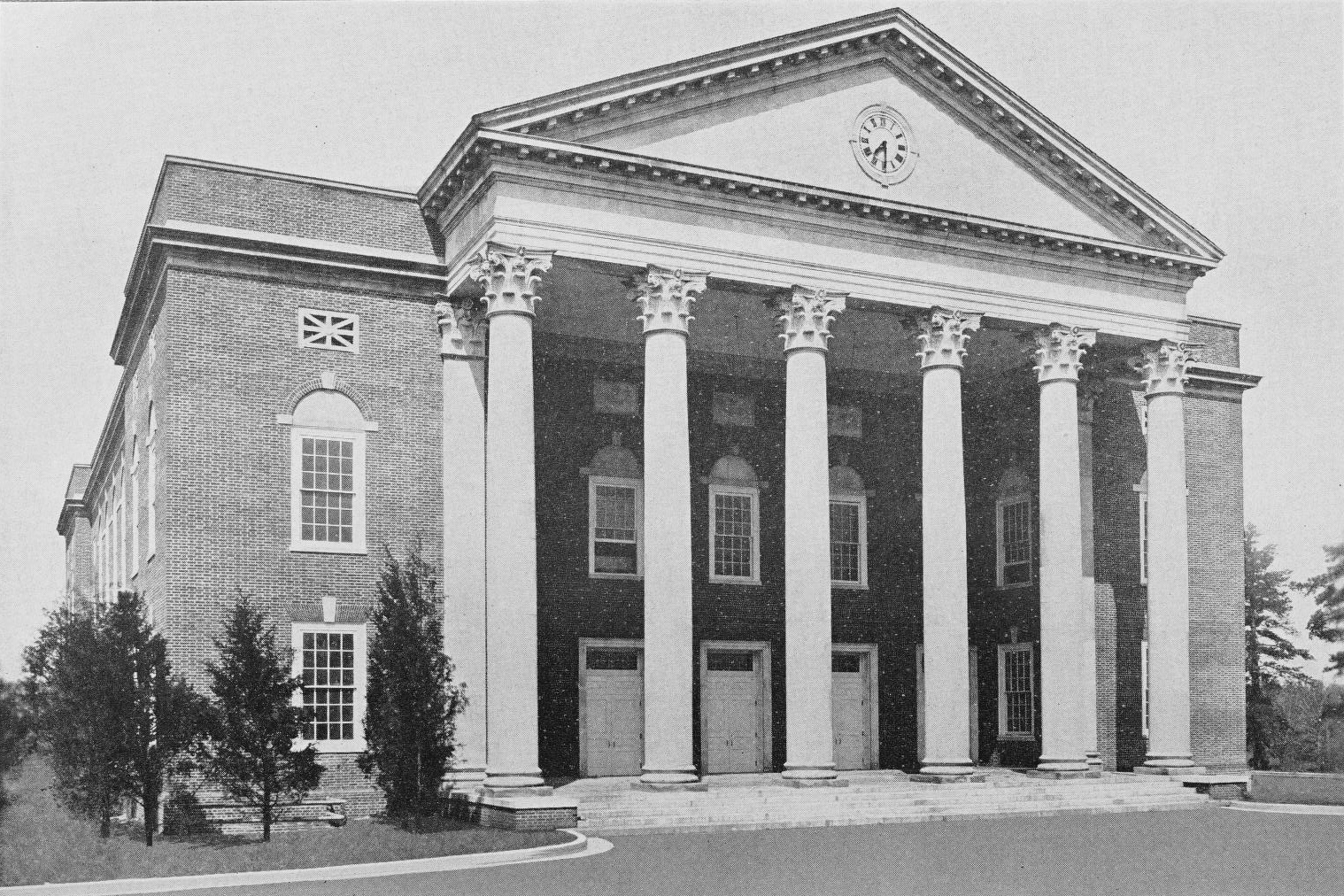
Richard J. Reynolds Memorial Auditorium

The R. J. Reynolds Memorial Auditorium, located in Winston-Salem, NC, was built 1919–1924 under the direction of architect Charles Barton Keen (designer of the R. J. Reynolds estate, Reynolda House). Keen also designed the adjacent Richard J. Reynolds High School. Both buildings are listed on the National Register of Historic Places.

The Auditorium and adjacent school sit on a tract of land formerly known as "Silver Hill." The 28-acre (110,000 m^{2}) tract of land now encompasses the Auditorium, the school, Hanes Park (named after the founder of Hanes Hosiery Company and then-mayor James G. Hanes), the Calvin H. Wiley Middle School and the Winston-Salem Central YMCA.

The Auditorium is now operated jointly by the Administration of the Richard J. Reynolds High School and the Winston-Salem/Forsyth County Schools. An auditorium manager is hired to take care of the day-to-day operations of the building and scheduling of performances and events.

The Auditorium is one of the oldest and largest performing arts centers in the City of Winston-Salem. The building can comfortably seat 1898 people, with 857 seats on the main Orchestra level and 1,041 seats located on the Mezzanine/Balcony area.

== History ==
In 1919, after the death of her husband R. J. Reynolds in 1918, Mrs. Katharine Smith Reynolds donated a large tract of land then known as "Silver Hill" to the City of Winston-Salem, North Carolina. Her plan was to have a grand school and auditorium built in memory of her late husband.

While the Richard J. Reynolds High School would serve the youth of the city, the Auditorium would serve the entire community and act as a gathering place in order for all citizens to participate in the arts. The building of the Auditorium only added to the City of Winston-Salem's reputation as the "City of the Arts."

The building was completed in 1924. By the time it was dedicated in a grand ceremony on May 8, 1924, Katharine Reynolds, who had married J. Edward Johnston in 1921, was hospitalized with a difficult pregnancy. She died on May 23, never having attended a production in the auditorium she had built in her first husband's memory.

A few weeks later, the first commencement exercises for the Richard J. Reynolds High School would be held in the Auditorium. On November 24, 1924, the Auditorium would play host to the first of its many famous guests, Harry Houdini. Other guests have included Jim Croce before his untimely death and pianist Peter Nero, both in the early 1970s.

== Architectural and artistic elements ==
The Grand Lobby of the Auditorium contains many pieces of art unique to the building itself. In the Lobby, one can find two large portraits, one of R. J. Reynolds and the other of Katharine Smith Reynolds. The portraits were made by Richard J. Reynolds High School graduate Joe King who also had the honor of creating a portrait of Queen Elizabeth II.

The Grand Lobby also contains three marble statues. The statues are duplicates of famous Italian works and were sculpted in Italy and transported to the United States, specifically for the construction of the Auditorium.

Within the main Orchestra level of the Auditorium, one can see a portrait of R. J. Reynolds III, whose family donated the necessary funds towards the renovation and restoration of the building (2000–2002).

Before the 2000-2002 renovation and restoration of the building, a large piece of custom made carpet sat just inside the Main Orchestra level at the middle doors leading from the Grand Lobby. The carpet piece featured a large tobacco leaf, in honor of R. J. Reynolds and his R. J. Reynolds Tobacco Company. The carpet piece was removed during the renovation and restoration and never replaced, with it being decided that the money could be better used toward upgrading the state of the art Auditorium sound system rather than buying a new custom made carpet piece.

== Traditions associated with the Auditorium and School ==
Before every performance at the Auditorium, members of the student-run Auditorium Technical Staff and Crew place roses under the portrait of Katherine Smith Reynolds-Johnston, in honor of her gift of the Auditorium and school. It is rumored the roses also help to ward off the "ghost" of Katharine Reynolds who haunts the building.

The title of the school hymn, originally written as the school song in 1949 by Olive Thomasina ("Tommye") Ring, "Her Portals Tall and Wide," refers to the large columns of the Auditorium. The Auditorium's portico and columns stand at three stories tall and face downtown Winston-Salem.

The current school song, with its official title of "Alma Mater," is also known as "Amid the Pines". Part of the first verse reads, "Amid the pines, she proudly stands; to her our voices rise." The Auditorium and School are situated on a large hill populated with grandiose pine trees which cover the entire campus. The pine trees are also mentioned in the school hymn: "Her pleasant paths, her trees, whisper courage through the breeze." Following every assembly, PTSA meeting or school performance inside the Auditorium, at one time including commencement, "The Alma Mater" is sung. During these assemblies, semi-formal or business casual dress, usually including blazers, shirts and ties for men, is customary attire for any person gracing the Auditorium's large stage. Tradition dictates that as the Alma Mater is sung, upon the line ending with "... dear Old Reynolds High", in three short beats, in a 3/4 time, the assembly should not stomp their feet because it is considered disrespectful.

Through the years, the hill upon which the school and Auditorium stand has become known as "Society Hill." The name commemorates the donation of the land and money to build the Auditorium and school from Mrs. Reynolds. a prominent member of the community. Generations of children, including some of the Reynolds' own children and Senator Richard Burr (R-NC) (class of 1974), have attended the school.

== Current operations ==
The auditorium is currently managed by Trevor Anderson and Robert Kratz. The auditorium serves as a venue for the Winston-Salem Forsyth County School System and private renters. It has received many off-Broadway productions and local dance companies. The drama department at Reynolds is currently taught by Jennifer Pierce who teaches out of the Black Box Theater. The orchestra director is currently Lisa Morris, and the band director is Jonathan Hamiel with assistant Adrian Thompson. Caitie Reece and Amelia Hailey are the current dance teachers. All teach in the Arts building adjacent to the main Auditorium. The chorus director is Joshua Settlemyre, who teaches in the chorus room, also adjacent to the main part of the Auditorium. The Choral, Orchestra, Band and Dance Departments all use the Auditorium regularly for performances.

== See also ==
- Richard J. Reynolds High School
- R. J. Reynolds
- R. J. Reynolds Tobacco Company
