= Reynolda Church =

- Reynolda Church
- 36°07′30″N 80°17′10″W
- Location: Winston-Salem, North Carolina, U.S.
- Address: Brookfield Drive
- Denomination: Presbyterian
- Website: https://reynoldachurch.org/

History
- Founder: Katharine Smith Reynolds

Architecture
- Completed: 1915 (111 years ago)

Reynolda Church (formerly Reynolda Presbyterian Church) is located on Brookfield Drive in Winston-Salem, North Carolina. It stands across Reynolda Road from Reynolda Village, of which it is considered a part. It was established in 1915 by Katharine Smith Reynolds, wife of R. J. Reynolds.

The R. J. Reynolds Memorial Auditorium formerly stood at the location, but it was rescued from demolition and moved to a site on the grounds of R. J. Reynolds High School.

The church was renovated by McLeod Associates Architect in the 21st century.
