= Reynolda Gardens =

Botanical garden in Winston-Salem, North Carolina, United States

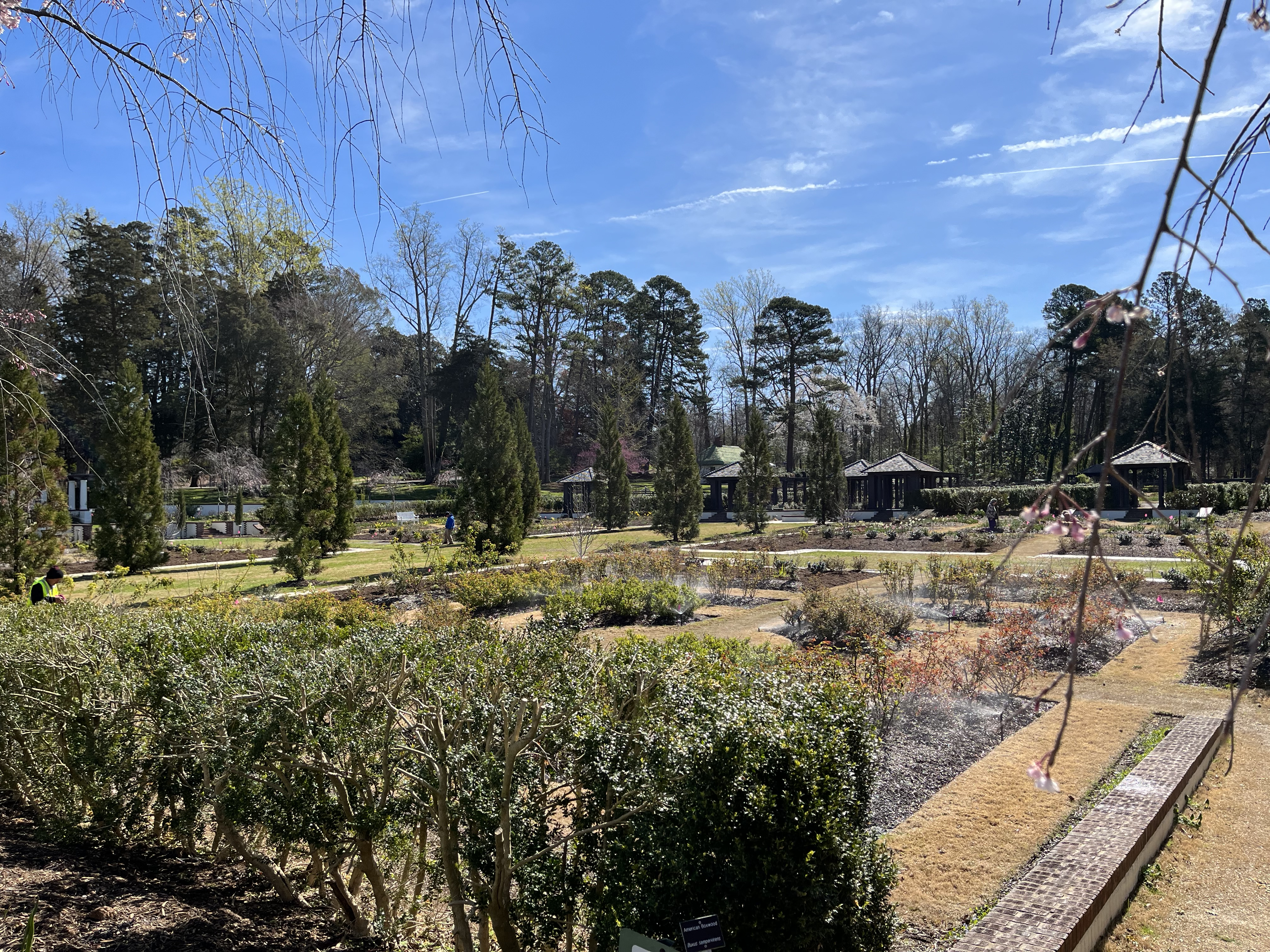
- The gardens in spring 2023

- Location within North Carolina
- Type: Garden
- Location: Reynolda Village
- Coordinates: 36.125348378°N 80.2845044°W
- Area: 125 acres (51 ha)
- Established: 1914 (112 years ago)
- Founder: Mary Reynolds Babcock
- Designer: Thomas W. Sears
- Owner: Wake Forest University
- Parking: Free on-site
- Website: reynolda.org/gardens/

Reynolda Gardens are located in Reynolda Village, adjacent to the Reynolda campus of Wake Forest University and the Reynolda House, in Winston-Salem, North Carolina. The gardens are open daily with free admission.

The gardens were originally part of a large country estate and farm (1067 acres) created by tobacco magnate R. J. Reynolds and his wife Katharine Smith Reynolds between 1906 and 1923. In 1913 the Lord & Burnham greenhouse was built to serve the family and farm, and to produce flowers commercially. Landscape architect Thomas W. Sears (1880–1966) designed the 4-acre (16,000 m^{2}) formal garden for Mrs. Reynolds, starting in 1915. After the death of Mrs. Reynolds (then remarried as Mrs. Johnston) in 1924, most of the property was gradually sold or given away, including a gift of 300 acres (1.2 km^{2}) to Wake Forest College in the late 1940s for its Winston-Salem campus. In a series of gifts from 1958 to 1962, the Reynolds' daughter Mary Reynolds Babcock established Reynolda Gardens by donating its property to the college.

In 1995 the college and the National Park Service performed extensive historic reconstruction to return the garden to its original design.

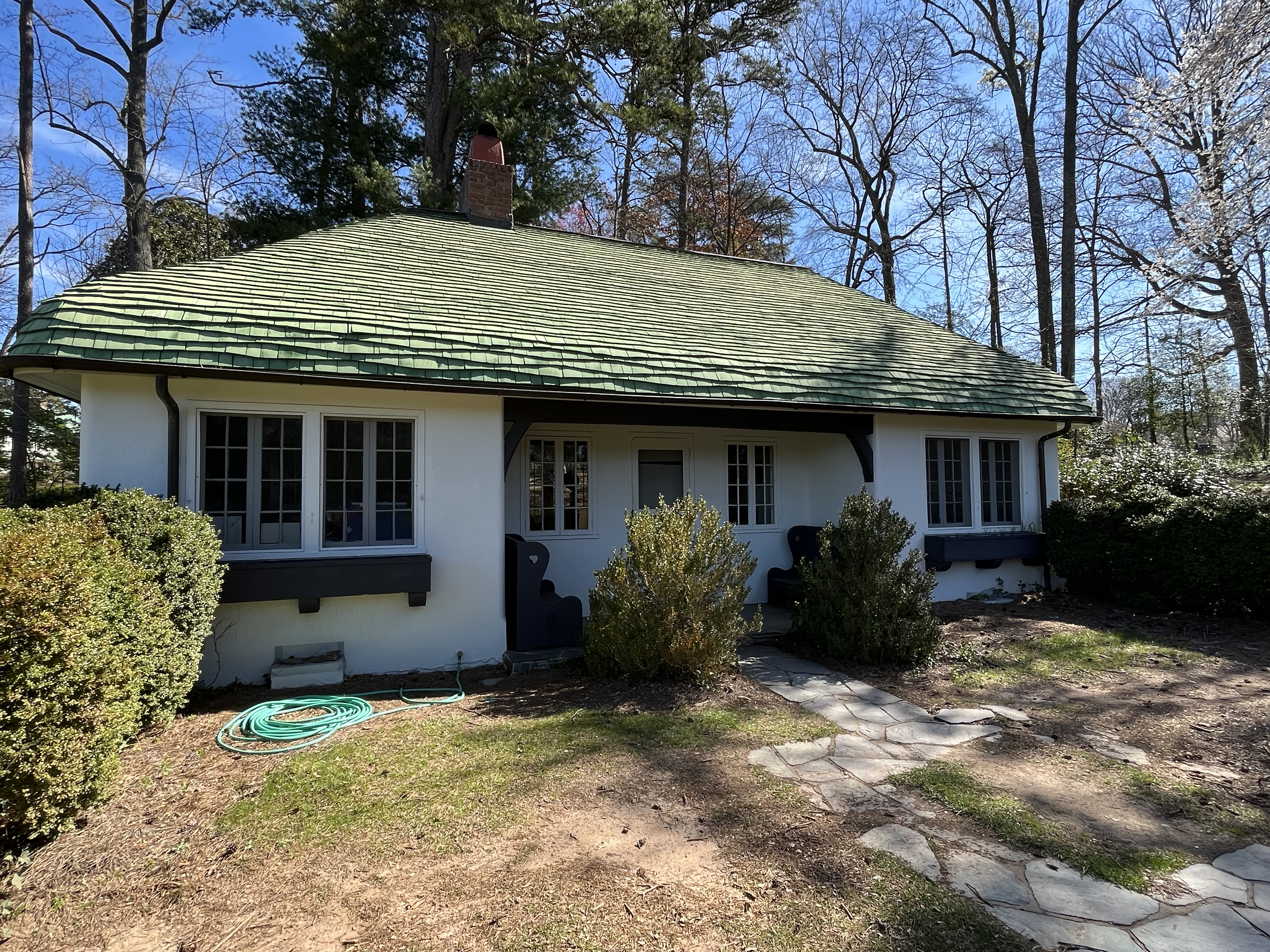
The former gardener's cottage, in the southeastern corner of the gardens

Today the gardens include 125 acres (0.51 km^{2}) of woodlands, fields, wetlands, and a 4-acre (16,000 m^{2}) formal garden with greenhouse. Two acres of the formal gardens comprise the Greenhouse Gardens (designed 1917, 1920, 1931) which centers around a sunken garden divided into four quadrants, with grass lawns, border plantings, rose gardens, theme gardens, specimen trees, and boxwood hedges, as well as tea-houses, fountains, and pergolas. The other half contains the Fruit, Cut Flower, and Nicer Vegetable Garden (1921), which grows vines, vegetables, climbing roses, and espaliered fruit trees.

The entire property also includes a 3/4-mile woodland trail, as well as a slightly longer perimeter trail (1.5 miles).

== See also ==
- Reynolda Historic District
- List of botanical gardens in the United States
