= Katharine Smith Reynolds =

American tobacco heiress and philanthropist (1880–1924)

- Katharine c. 1900
- Born: Katharine Smith; November 17, 1880; Mount Airy, North Carolina, U.S.
- Died: May 23, 1924 (aged 43); New York City, U.S.
- Education: Sullins College
- Known for: Reynolda House
- Spouse: R. J. Reynolds (m. 1905; died 1918) J. Edward Johnston (m. 1921)
- Children: 6, including R. J. Reynolds Jr. and Zachary Smith Reynolds

Katharine Smith Reynolds (November 17, 1880 – May 23, 1924), later Katharine Smith Johnston, was the wife of tobacco tycoon R. J. Reynolds and a philanthropist who designed the Reynolda House estate.

== Early life ==
Katharine Smith was born in Mount Airy, North Carolina. Smith was the oldest of six children of a prosperous local businessman, Zachary T. Smith and his wife, Mary Susan Jackson. She was well educated and attended the State Normal and Industrial School, now known as the University of North Carolina at Greensboro, in the fall of 1897. In late 1899, a typhoid epidemic broke out on the campus. The first student to die was freshman Linda Tom on November 15, and thirteen more would die in the next two months. 55 student were ultimately diagnosed, including Smith. After the outbreak, about one-third of the student body didn't return. Katharine transferred to Sullins College in Bristol, Virginia, where she graduated in 1902.

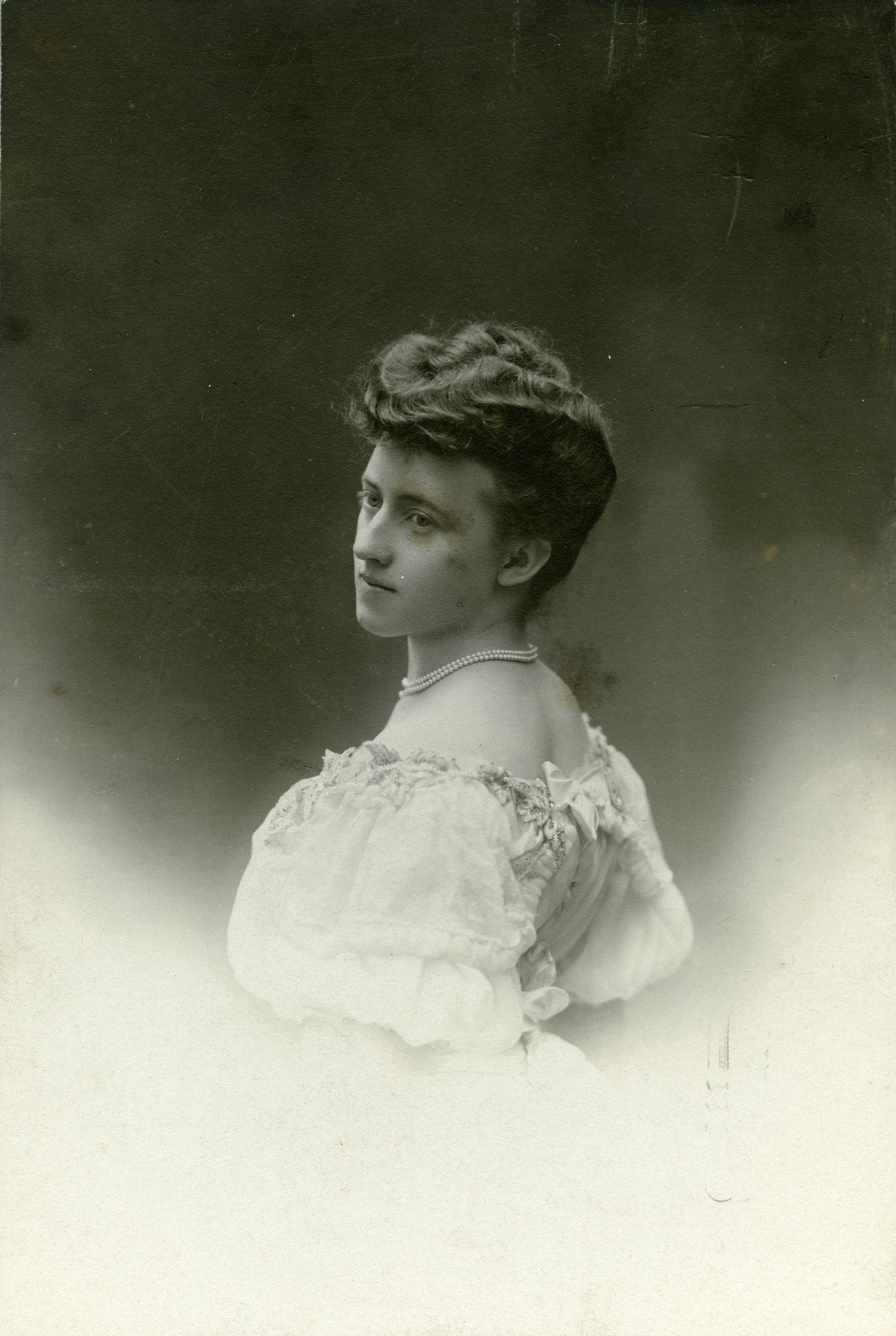
Katharine Smith Reynolds in 1905 during her honeymoon in Paris

Smith earned a Mistress of English degree from Sullins. After returning to Mt Airy after graduation, she temporarily worked as an art teacher for painting china plates, a popular craft during the American Arts and Crafts Movement. She moved to Winston in 1903 and worked for R. J. Reynolds, her first cousin once removed, as a secretary at the R. J. Reynolds Tobacco Company. While living in the city, she lived at the home of D. and Carrie Rich, the cashier of the company and his wife, at 657 West Fifth Street, directly across from the Reynolds Queen Anne-style mansion at 666 Fifth St. The two eventually married in 1905. After an early 8 a.m. ceremony, the couple left for a lavish four-month honeymoon across Europe. The couple then moved into the Reynolds mansion, site of the present-day Forsyth County Public Library.

== Reynolda House ==
Reynolda, located in Winston-Salem, North Carolina, was the 1,067 acre estate of Katharine and R.J. Reynolds. Though unusual in its being in the South, the creation of Reynolda reflected the national American Country House movement. Wealthy Americans sought to escape the city for a rural estate with extensive farming and sporting facilities. Reynolds was a subscriber to periodicals such as American Country Life. Closely involved in both the design and construction, Katharine Reynolds envisioned a progressive, self-sustaining country farm and estate built upon the selected 1,000-acre land outside of Winston-Salem. She hired engineering firm Buckenham and Miller to draw up the master plan, renowned architect Charles Barton Keen of Philadelphia to design the central house (called the "bungalow"), and Harvard-educated landscape architect Thomas Sears to plan the gardens.

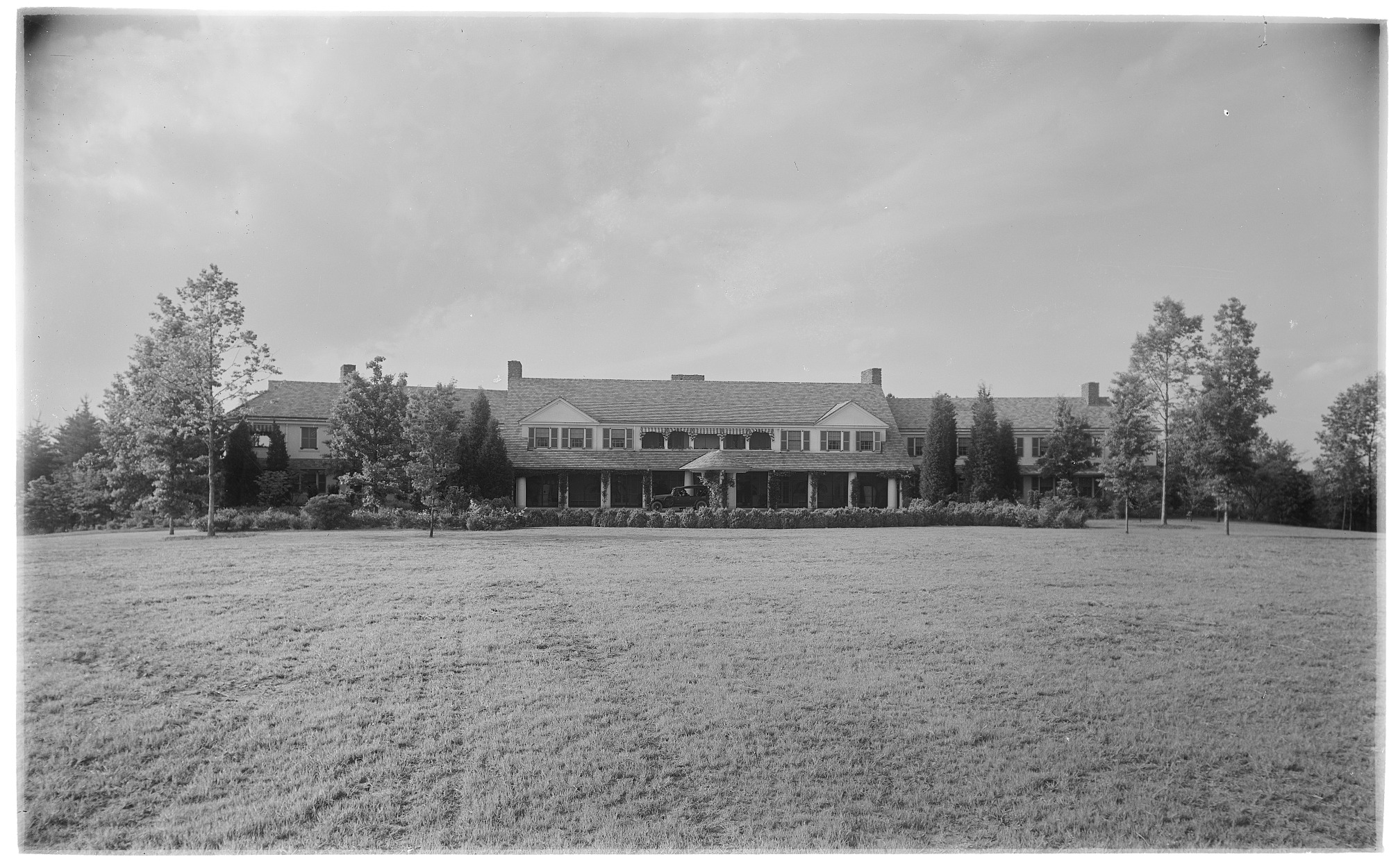
South facade and entrance of Reynolda House in 1919

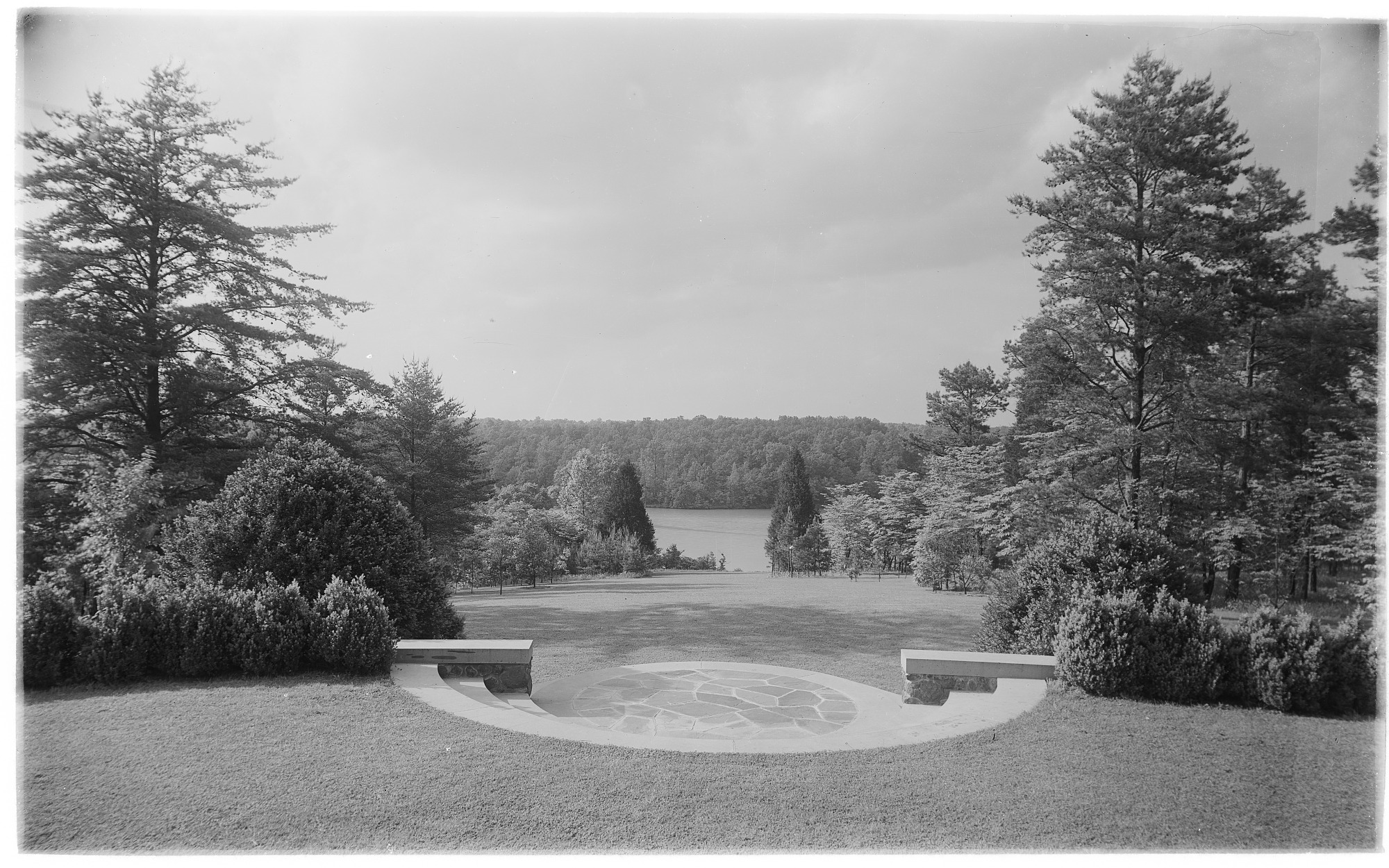
View of Lake Katharine from the lake porch of Reyolda House

The land acquisitions for Reynolda began in 1906, with 106 acres (that would later be sold and makes up present-day Graylyn). The future estate's amenities began with the creation of a nine-hole golf course. The golf links would have taken up all of the original 106 acres of farmland; however, RJR joked that he “didn’t want to put a good farmer [Katharine] out of business” if the golf course was created, and more land was bought across the road. For 13 more years, Reynolds continually purchased land, with the full approval of her husband, making the final acquisition in 1914. The estate was originally named Maplewood Farms, due to maple trees that were planted along the road leading up to the property.

Reynolds closely supervised the creation of the estate, often driving in from town to visit the construction sites. When the Reynolds family finally moved into the main house in December 1917, Reynolda was home to a farm complete with the latest in technology and agricultural practices, a dairy, recreational facilities, an English-style village for white estate workers, and a school for estate worker's children. There was also a separate segregated village for black estate workers, named Five Row.

Besides a family home, the estate's original intention was centered in agriculture. The Reynolda farm and diary were semi-public in order to serve as an "experiment station" for visitors, with demonstrations of the most recent technology and hygiene procedures by graduates of the North Carolina College of Agriculture and Mechanic Arts, such as fertilizer use, crop rotation, soil analysis. Reynolds was very interested in modern hygiene practices, on the farm and in the family home. For example, Reynolds wrote to her dairy workers in 1912: "Please see that the following directions are carried out to the letter...Before commencing to milk, brush off all the cows. Milkers’ hands and cows’ udders must be washed with soap and water and rinsed before commencing to milk — one cow at a time just before milking her, of course.” One of her surviving books, with notes and sentences underlines by Reynolds herself, includes The Story of Germs (1912) by H. W. Conn.

== Philanthropy ==
As a woman of privilege and wealth, she sought social progress and progressive reform, as evidenced in her push for reforms in the tobacco factory. These included amenities such as hot lunches and water fountains to a nursery for working women. In addition, she was an active member of the Young Women's Christian Association (YWCA) which provided educational and recreational opportunities for young working women, and served as President of the local Winston-Salem chapter in 1917. During World War I, through the R.J Reynolds tobacco company, she made monetary contributions to the Red Cross to aid in shelter, food, and supplies overseas as well as formed a local chapter with several other prominent women. She was also active in the American Fund for the French Wounded, donating supplies and money and reviewing monthly reports and balance sheets for the organization as well as the Woman's Committee, serving as state chairman for a sub-organization of this war time committee. Outside of her extensive organizational donations, she donated to many religious causes, helping build churches and supporting missionary activities and programs.

In memory of her first husband she donated funds and land for the creation of the R.J. Reynolds High School. A lavish music festival was held through May 8–11 for the dedication of the Memorial Auditorium, just weeks before Katharine would die. A souvenir program for the events says: "In 1919, the City of Winston-Salem, in the course of its ex-tended school building program, planned a model high school, and wished to honor the memory of Richard J. Reynolds, by naming it 'The Richard J. Reynolds High School.' It seemed to his wife, now Mrs. J. Edward Johnston, that a memorial of this kind was very fitting, as Mr. Reynolds had had such a large part and was so interested in the development of this city. Mrs. Johnston had wanted to erect some really worth while memorial personally, and when notified of the action of the city authorities, it seemed that this plant, which would be so closely identified with the life of the people, young and old, presented the opportunity for which she was looking. She therefore notified the city that she would be glad to give a suitable site upon which to erect the high school, the selection to be left to the City, and to present as a personal memorial, a beautiful auditorium in connection with the high school plant." After her death, a public memorial service was held in the same auditorium.

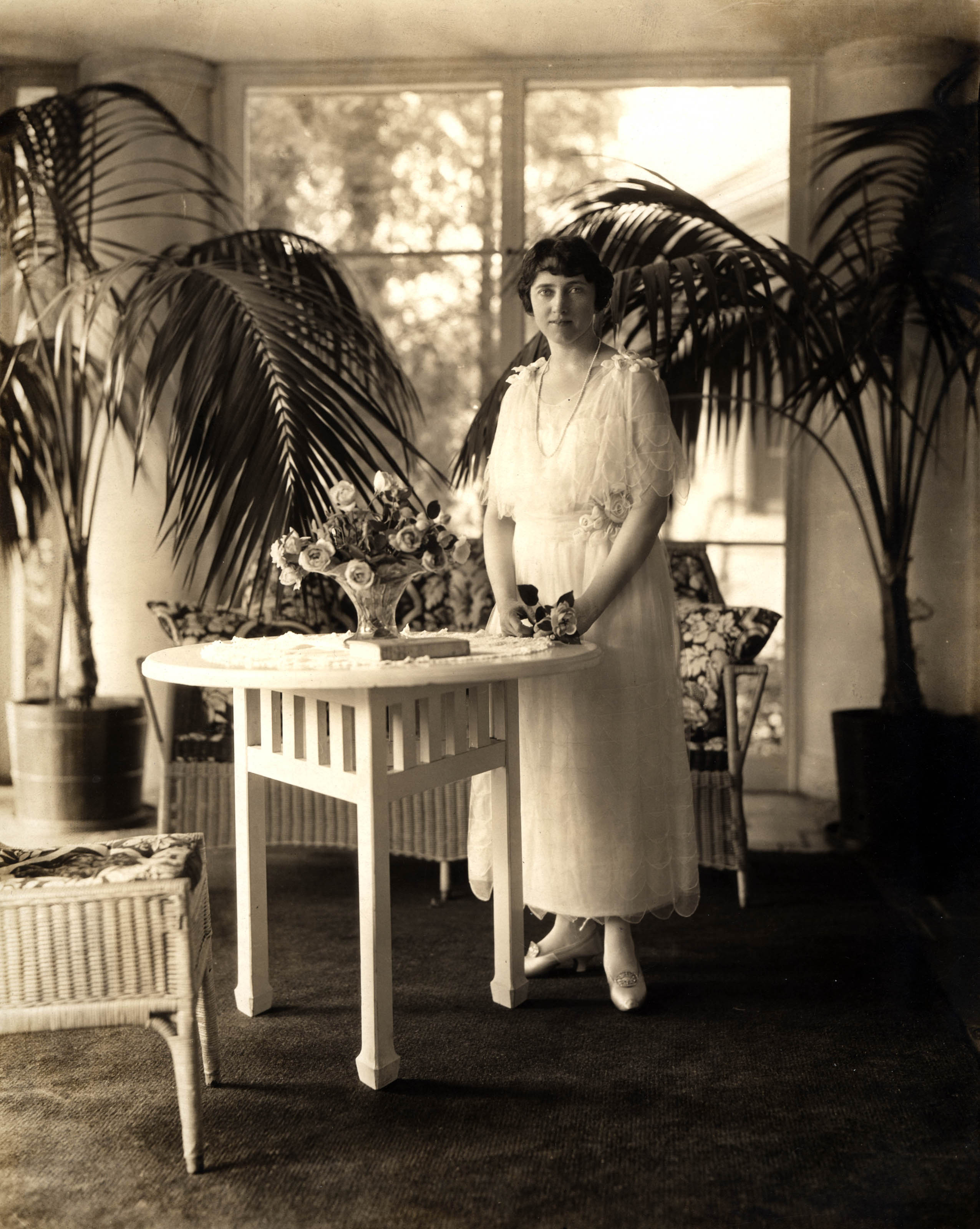
Katharine Smith Reynolds on the Reynolda House sun porch in 1921

== Personal life ==
Katharine was married to tobacco tycoon R.J Reynolds from 1905 to 1918. The two had four children together: Richard Joshua Reynolds Jr. (April 4, 1906 - December 14, 1964), Mary Katharine Reynolds (August 8, 1908 - July 17, 1953), Nancy Susan Reynolds (February 5, 1910 - January 1985) and Zachary Smith Reynolds (November 5, 1911 - July 6, 1932). Katharine struggled with heart problems throughout her life, possibly due to an undiagnosed rheumatic fever. As a result, her pregnancies were dangerous. For the birth of Nancy a trained nurse was hired on to care for Katharine and the baby. Nancy would remember later in her life that "Mother liked her so much, and we all got along so well, that she stayed on [after the birth]. She was a graduate nurse. We called her by the nickname “Bum.” Her name was Henriette van den Berg, and I suppose Bum is about as close to van den Berg as children can get...She was a very important member of our household.... Oh, she bossed my mother. She called Mother ‘Dearie.’ But Mother was pretty strong, indeed, and I think a little jealous of Bum sometimes, because she did have so much influence over us. But Mother had so much to do that she couldn’t have done it alone, it was really too much for her.”

After the birth of Nancy in 1910, she was advised by her doctors to not have anymore children. Zachary Smith was born a year later, and she was warned another pregnancy would likely kill her. In early 1914 she suffered a heart attack due to becoming pregnant again, and was rushed to Johns Hopkins Hospital in Baltimore. Due to the risk that continuing the pregnancy would end her life, the decision was made to terminate.

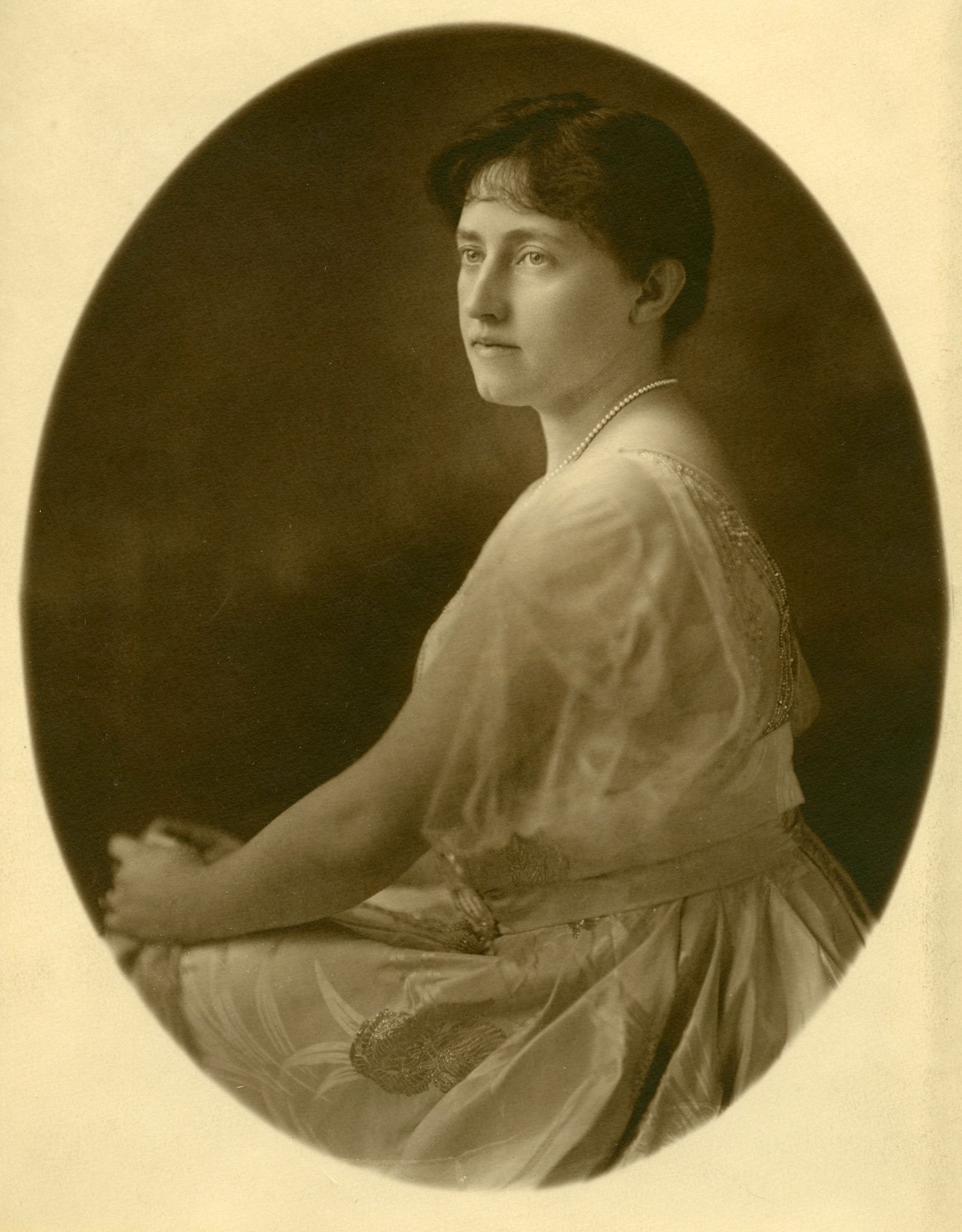
Studio portrait of Katharine Smith Reynolds

In early 1917, R.J. was ill and increasingly in pain with what was most likely pancreatic cancer. In a letter to a friend around this time, Katharine reported that “His trouble seems to have started [in the summer] with gastritis which went into a small stomach ulceration which healed very quickly, but left him in a rundown, nervous condition.” As his illness became more severe, he had traveled between treatment centers and hospitals with lack of success. He spent Fall of 1917 at Johns Hopkins Hospital. While originally allowed access to her husband, his doctors eventually prohibited all visitors, on grounds that his worry over business matters was worsening his condition. His doctor Thomas R. Brown, in a letter to Katharine, stated that her "great knowledge of his business... could not fail to keep his mind more or less active along business channels," and recommended to only write him "short, very cheerful letters, without any reference to his business affairs.”

Reynolds held misgivings at the decision, and eventually became isolated from her husband and the care he was receiving. A letter during the spouse's separation reads: "“I am wondering if this strange separation from one who loves you better than all others in the world is doing you good? I trust that it is, for your health comes above everything else, but I cannot tell just how you are getting on from Miss Taliaferro’s letters. I would think from their cheery note you were about well. You will never know how terribly I miss you and love you and want your arms again around me and the children.” At this same time, she wrote his nurse Ella Taliaferro: “This has been the most awful trial I’ve ever been through in my life – if you would only tell me something real of Mr. Reynolds – how much he weighs, what he has gained, how many hours he sleeps out of twenty-four, how much he sleeps at night? It would make it a little more bearable. For I am his wife and I love him above all else in the world and I am not in isolation or having a rest cure and not likely to, if it keeps me away from all I hold dear…. Of course, I know you are doing everything you can for him and that he is in the best of hands; but in the lonely, dark hours of the night when sleep will not come, only seeing him would convince me that he is all right…. Now please send me a telegram at my expense and tell me just how Mr. Reynolds is. I wonder if you realize, my dear, how little real information you give me.”

By winter of 1917, R.J. felt better enough to return to Winston-Salem. The Reynolda House construction had been completed and the family officially moved in for Christmas of 1917. However, in early 1918 he was again in much pain and bedridden. While at Reynolda, the room created to be his study was converted into a sick room; In July 1918, he underwent a major surgery and was brought home by private railway car. Nine days later, on July 29, 1918, Reynolds died. Due to his popularity in Winston-Salem, banks and City Hall itself were shut down on July 31, the day of his funeral.; the local municipal council also passed a resolution asking local businesses to close for three hours in consideration. The Reynolds family and friends were joined in the funerary procession by Reynolda servants, local Masons, a Boy Scout troop, and thousands lining the streets of downtown Winston-Salem.

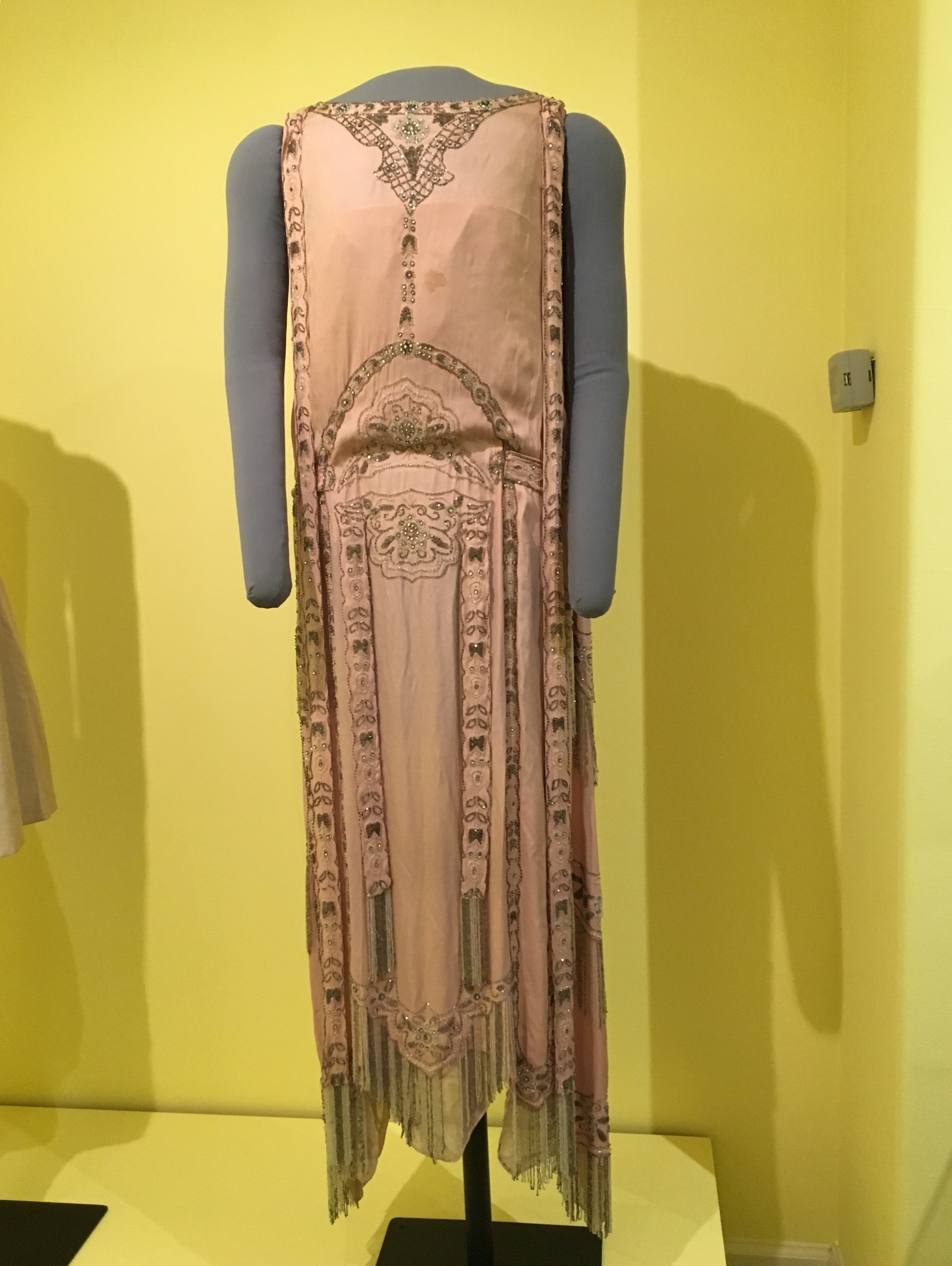
Extant 1920s garment belonging to Katharine Smith Reynolds, exhibited at Reynolda House

After R.J.'s death, Katherine dressed in black mourning and, when unable to sleep at night, would go down to Reynolda House's reception hall to play on the house's aeolian organ. A year into the mourning period, she began holding Sunday evening dances for teachers of the newly expanded estate school. She soon began courting the school principal, J. Edward "Ed" Johnston, about thirteen years her junior. Katharine was the most eligible bachelorette in Winston-Salem high-society; the relationship caused much gossip due to the age and class difference. Within Katharine's family, her daughters Mary and Nancy liked Johnston and were apparently pleased with the new relationship. However, her son R.J. Reynolds Jr, known as "Dick," was upset and angered. Nancy recalled in a 1980 interview that "Dick had been very much a trial to mother, he did not like— I think he was jealous...because we two girls found him most attractive, so we were all for it, it was just delightful to have him in the family...But Dick couldn't take any of this, he was very, very upsetting to mother." Prior to telling Dick of her new relationship, in a letter to a friend, Katharine said she was more nervous to tell Dick about Johnston than her own parents. Johnston's increasing time at Reynolda lead Dick to avoid the estate, staying with his uncle William Neal Reynolds or working for the tobacco company, at one time putting in a 45-hour work week; her child's reaction to Johnston deeply saddened Katharine. Describing telling her parents of the relationship, she wrote that “I told them how I’d worked and planned for the happiness of others, but now I was working and planning day and night for my own..."

J. Edward Johnston and Katharine married June 11, 1921, in the Reception Hall of Reynolda House, in front of the inglenook fireplace, in a small ceremony attended by her three youngest children. A weekend of festivities preceded the ceremony, including a concert for over 500 guests. Her daughter Mary, 12 at the time, wrote in her diary after the marriage: “At about 7:15, Mother was married to Mr. Johnston. The affair was very quiet. Smith was ring bearer, and Nancy and myself were flower girls. We are trying to keep it quiet, but about the [whole] town knows it.” Dick refused to attend the service, deeply disturbing his mother.

After a multi-month honeymoon abroad in Europe, the couple settled in a cottage on the Reynolda Estate, leaving the children in the main house under the primary care of their governess, Henrietta van den Berg. A letter from van den Berg to Katharine during the honeymoon said that the children were "'so happy in your happiness,'" reassuring her she had Dick in hand, and that Nancy had told her "'I am so happy, it is wonderful to have a Father again.'" Sometime in the early 1920s a portrait of Mr. Johnston by society portraitist Frank Owen Salisbury was painted.

The new Mrs. Johnston soon became pregnant and they, along with Katharine's children Mary, Nancy, and Smith, moved into a New York apartment to have easier access to doctors for the pregnancy. The night of May 1, 1922, a baby girl, Lola Katharine Johnston, was born to the couple, but died a day later at 11 o'clock in the morning. Due to her heart problems, Johnston was frequently seeing doctors at this point in her life, and pregnancy was extremely dangerous for her. Before the pregnancy and birth of Lola, Dick had told Edward Johnston of his mother's condition and emphasized that she should not get pregnant. Once, catching his mother and Ed Johnston in an intimate moment, he punched Johnston in the face. However, Katharine was determined to give her new husband a baby, saying she'd do it "even if it killed [her]."

Despite the danger, she became pregnant in late 1923. The Johnstons again moved to New York for better medical access. On May 21, 1924, she gave birth to a son, J. Edward Johnston Jr; however, due to complications of a brain embolism caused by this childbirth, she died three days later at the age of 44.

== Legacy ==
After her death, J. Edward Johnston created a memorial for his late wife—originally located behind one of Katharine's local creations, the Reynolda Presbyterian Church—called the Katharine Johnston Memorial Circle. Johnston intended for Katharine, and himself eventually, to be interred at the site; however, her son Dick insisted her grave remain at Salem Cemetery where she was buried beside her first husband. The principle piece of the memorial, an obelisk made of Mt. Airy granite, presently resides in front of R.J. Reynolds High School, next to Hawthorne Rd. At the base of the monument is a statement of contemporary pastor Rev. Lilly: KATHARINE SMITH JOHNSTON. To her was given the vision of life in its larger meaning; She wrought with understanding heart for a greater future for mankind; All that love and labor for this cause rise up and call her blessed; ANNO DOMINI MCMXXIV."

After Reynolds died in 1924, the estate was held in trust until 1934 when Katharine and R.J's daughter Mary and Mary's husband Charles Babcock Sr acquired Reynolda House. They worked to modernize the estate and eventually donated much of the land for an art museum opened in 1967.

An honors scholarship and a dormitory exists in her name at the University of North Carolina at Greensboro. Known as the Katharine Smith Reynolds Scholarship, it grants honor student recipients funding for community service involvement as well as internship and study abroad programs and opportunities.

In 2016, the Kimpton Hotel in Winston-Salem, North Carolina, opened a restaurant named after Katharine called The Katharine Brasserie and Bar.
