= Reynolda House Museum of American Art =

American art Museum

Coordinates: 36.1257°N 80.2829°W

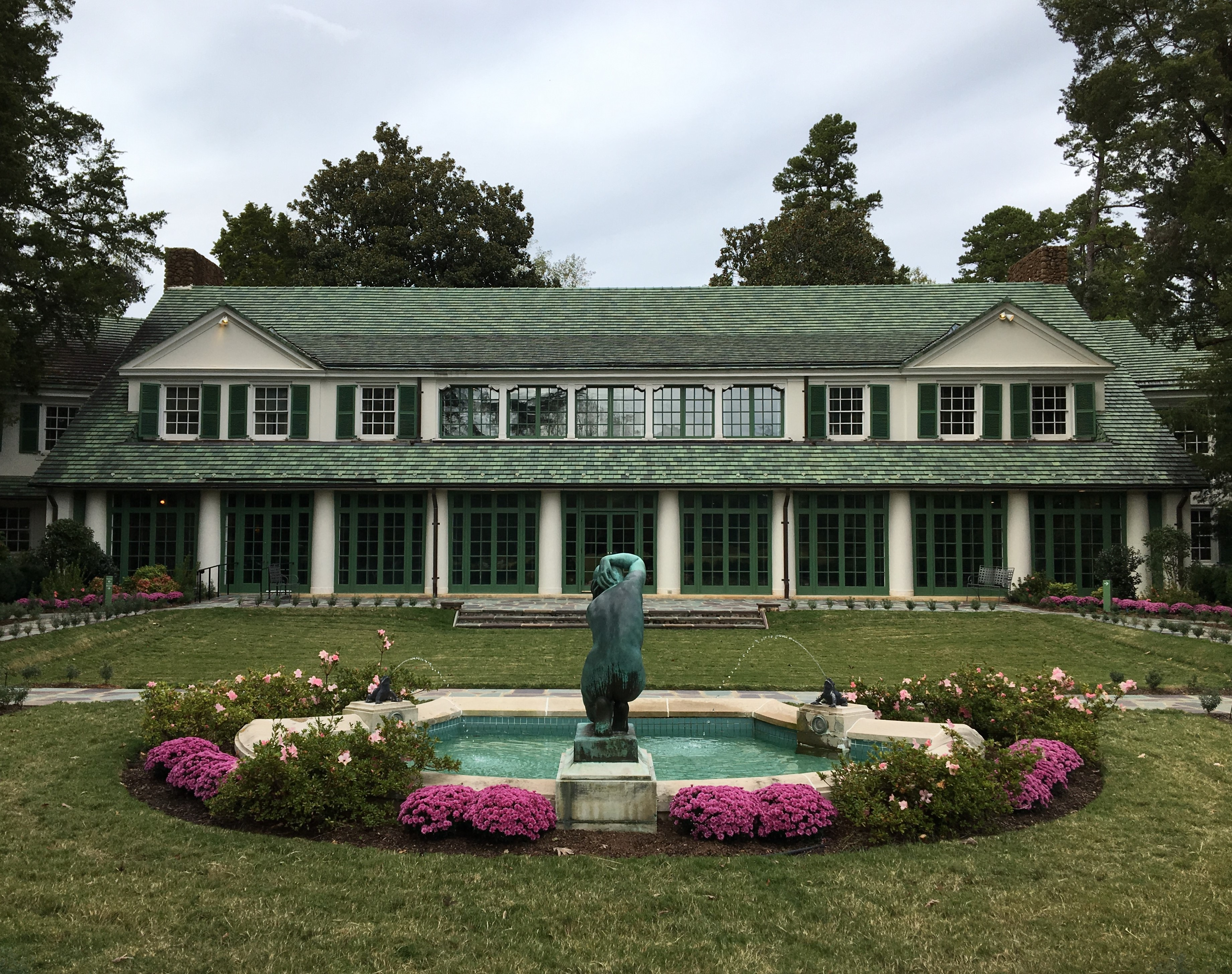
- View from front lawn
- Established: 1967
- Location: 2250 Reynolda Road, Winston-Salem, NC 27106
- Director: Allison Perkins
- Website: reynoldahouse.org

The Reynolda House Museum of American Art is an art museum located in Winston-Salem, North Carolina. Built in 1917 by Katharine Smith Reynolds and her husband R. J. Reynolds, founder of the R. J. Reynolds Tobacco Company, it displays a collection of American art ranging from the colonial period to the modern era. The house originally occupied the center of a 1,067-acre (4.32 km^{2}) estate. It opened to the public as an institution dedicated to the arts and education in 1965, and as an art museum in 1967.

== History ==
Design and construction began in 1912 and lasted until the end of 1917. Charles Barton Keen, who had gained success designing homes in Pennsylvania and New York, was the architect of not only the main house, but also the village on the estate that included a church, stables, and a school. Katharine Reynolds was very involved with the design of Reynolda, and some of her correspondence with Keen survives. The family finally moved in December 1917, but R. J. Reynolds was ill with pancreatic cancer and was not able to enjoy his new home. He died July 29, 1918.

Reynolda was the home of two generations of the Reynolds family. In 1935, Mary Reynolds Babcock, the elder daughter, acquired the estate. She and her husband Charles Babcock used the house as their vacation home until 1948, when they moved permanently to Reynolda. The property remained in the family for nearly 50 years. The museum restored its rooms and furnishings to reflect the periods when the family lived there. The iconic green Ludowici terra cotta tile roof influenced many other prominent homes and architecture around Winston-Salem. Reynolda became affiliated with Wake Forest University in 2002.

== Features ==
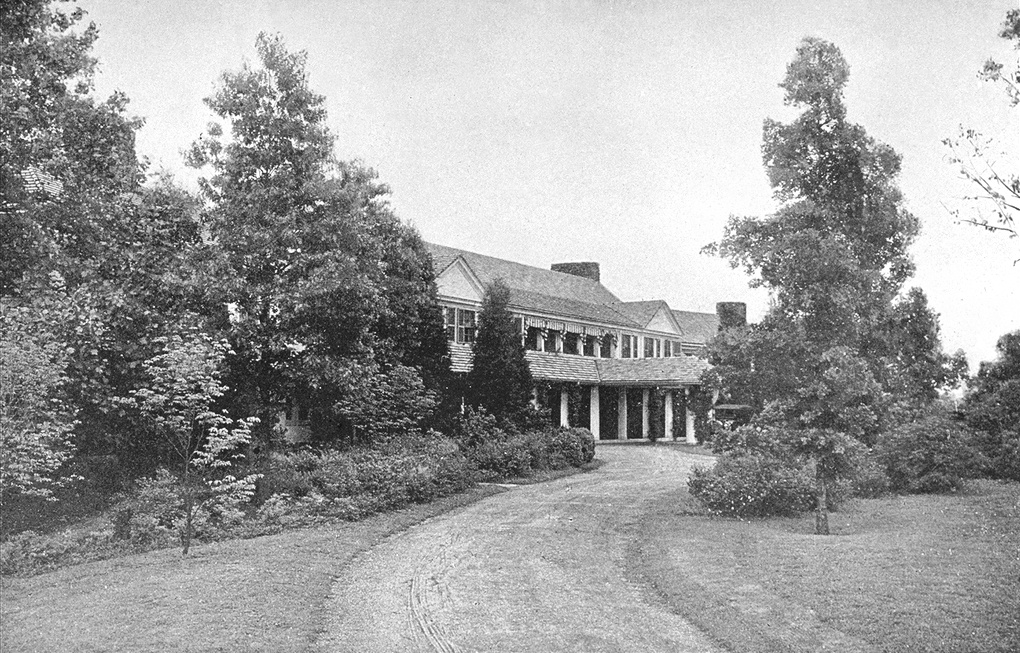
View of Reynolda House, ca. 1915

Located on Reynolda Road, a large portion of Reynolda can be explored on foot. In addition to the house, 28 of the original thirty buildings remain. To the west lie the restored formal gardens with Japanese cryptomeria and weeping cherry trees. The 16-acre (65,000 m^{2}) lake behind the house ("Lake Katharine") has reverted to wetlands which provide a home for a variety of wildlife. Many of the buildings in the village are occupied by boutiques, shops, and restaurants. A short walk across the dam leads from the village to Wake Forest University, which was built on land donated from the grounds of Reynolda House to the college by Mary and Charles Babcock.

A French restaurant, La Chaudiere, once occupied the family's former boiler room, but closed in the 1990s.

== Permanent collection ==
Reynolda House Museum of American Art houses a permanent collection of American art and sculpture from three centuries. The artists featured in the collection include Mary Cassatt, Frederic Church, Jacob Lawrence, Georgia O'Keeffe, and Gilbert Stuart. Most of the pieces are displayed throughout the historic house.

=== Selected collection highlights ===
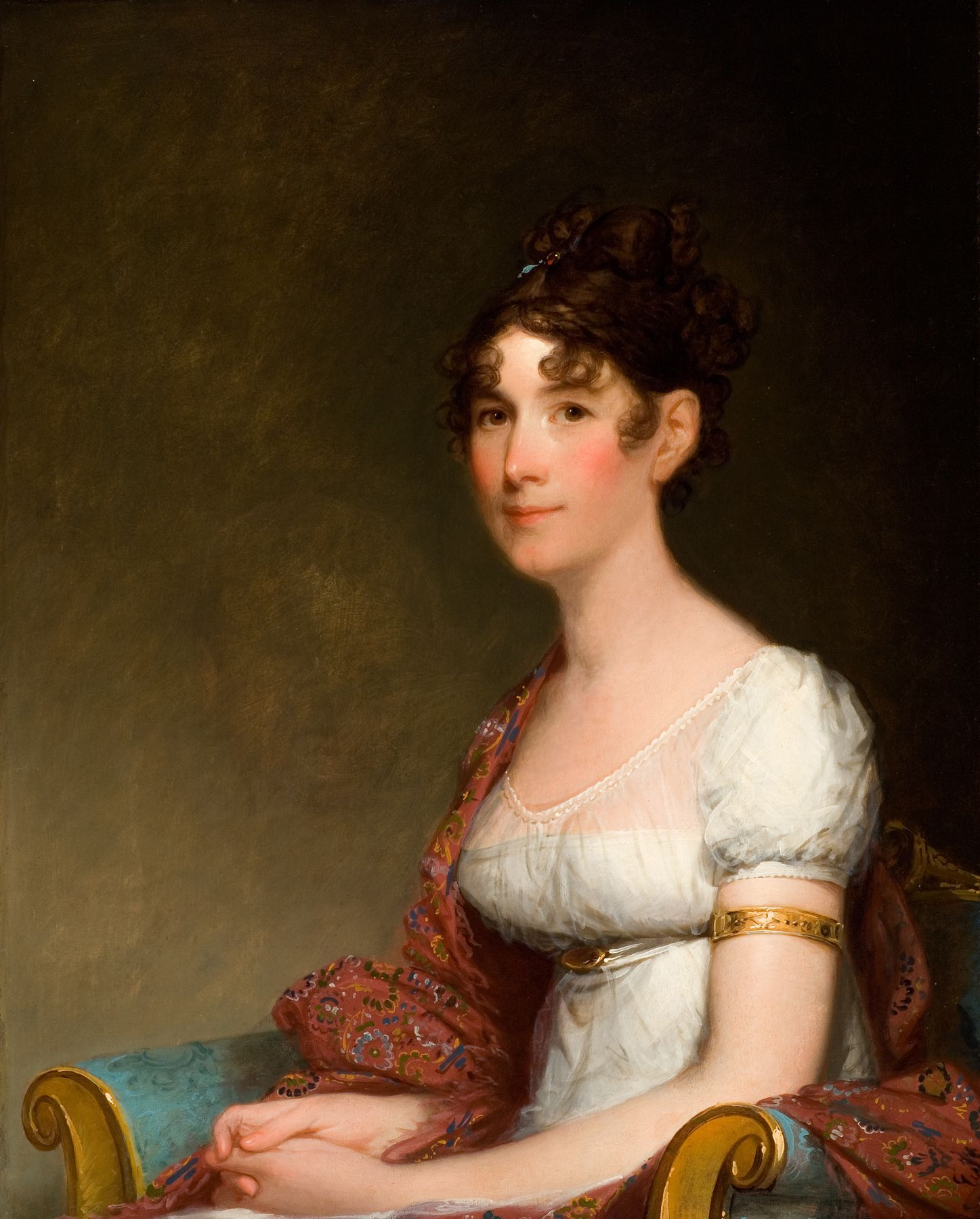
Gilbert Stuart, Mrs. Harrison Gray Otis, 1809

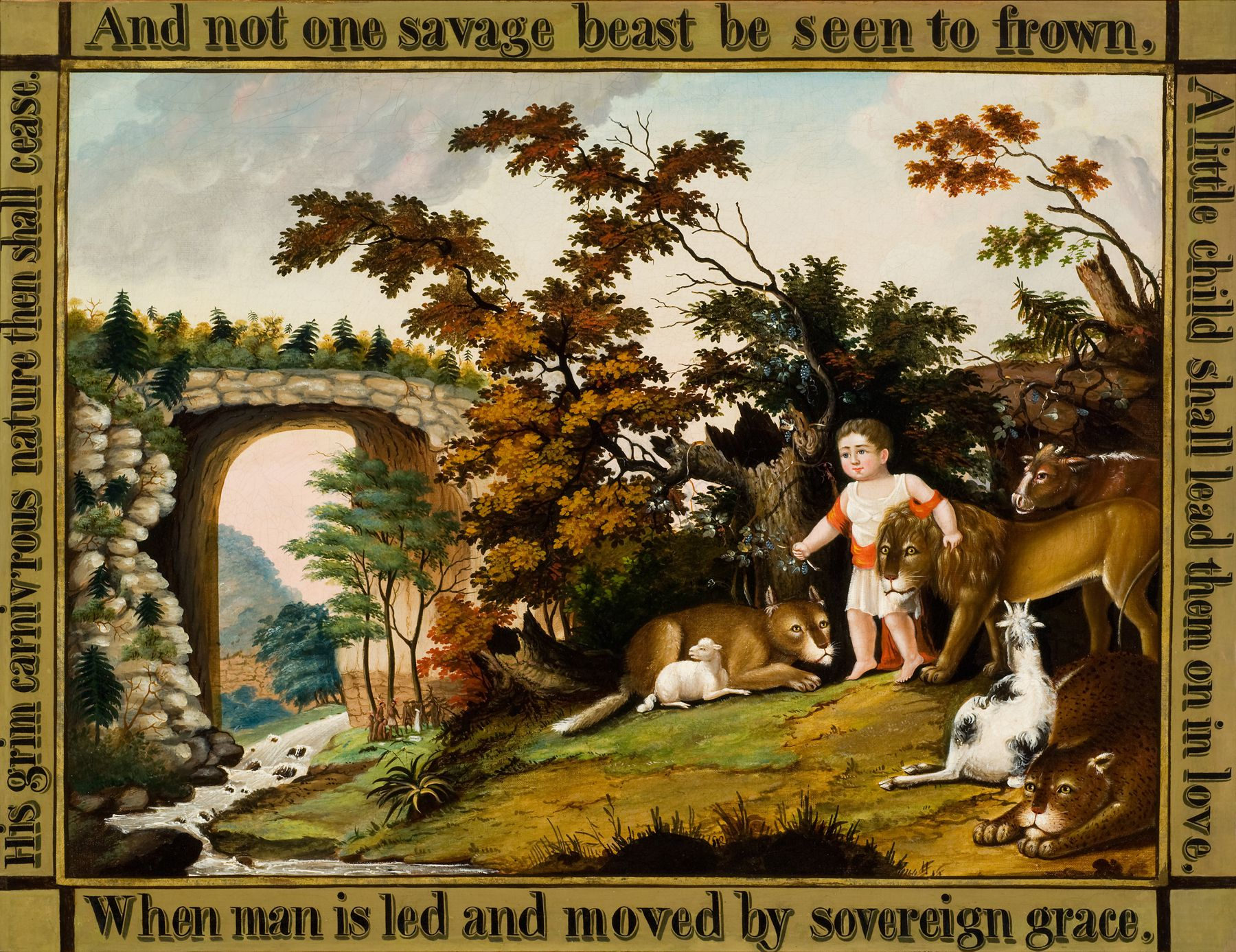
Edward Hicks, Peaceable Kingdom of the Branch, c. 1826-30

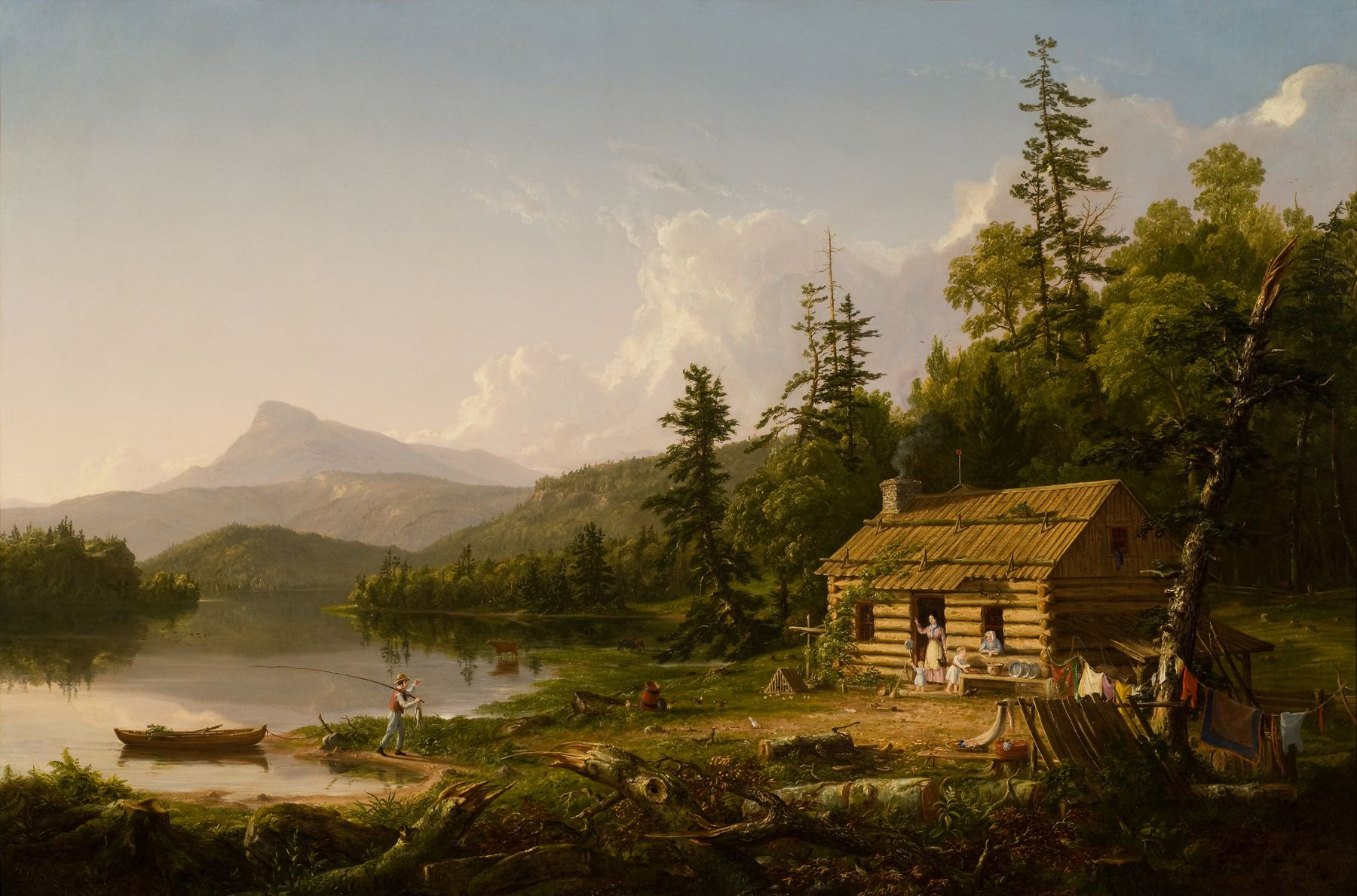
Thomas Cole, Home in the Woods, 1847

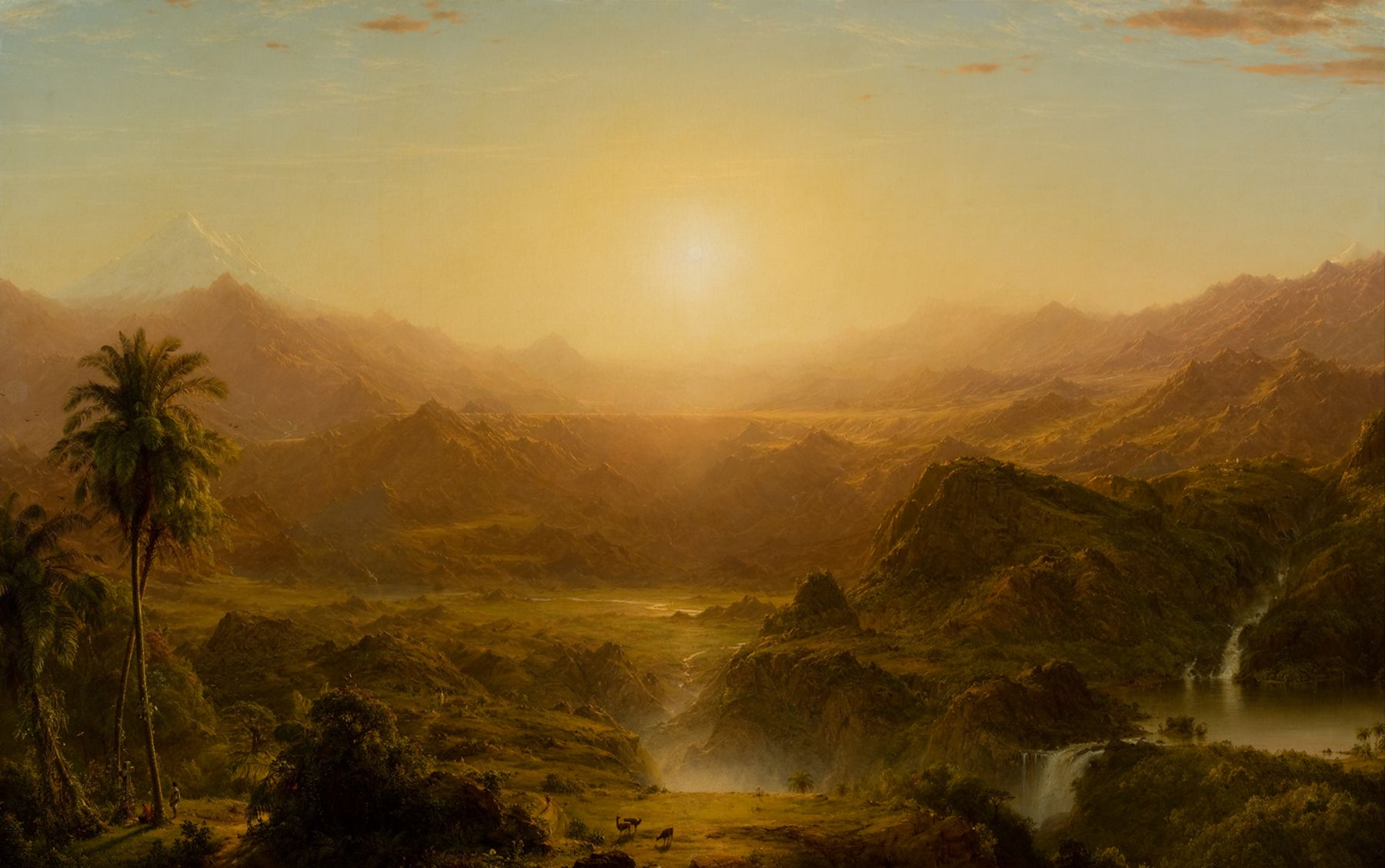
Frederic Church, The Andes of Ecuador, 1855

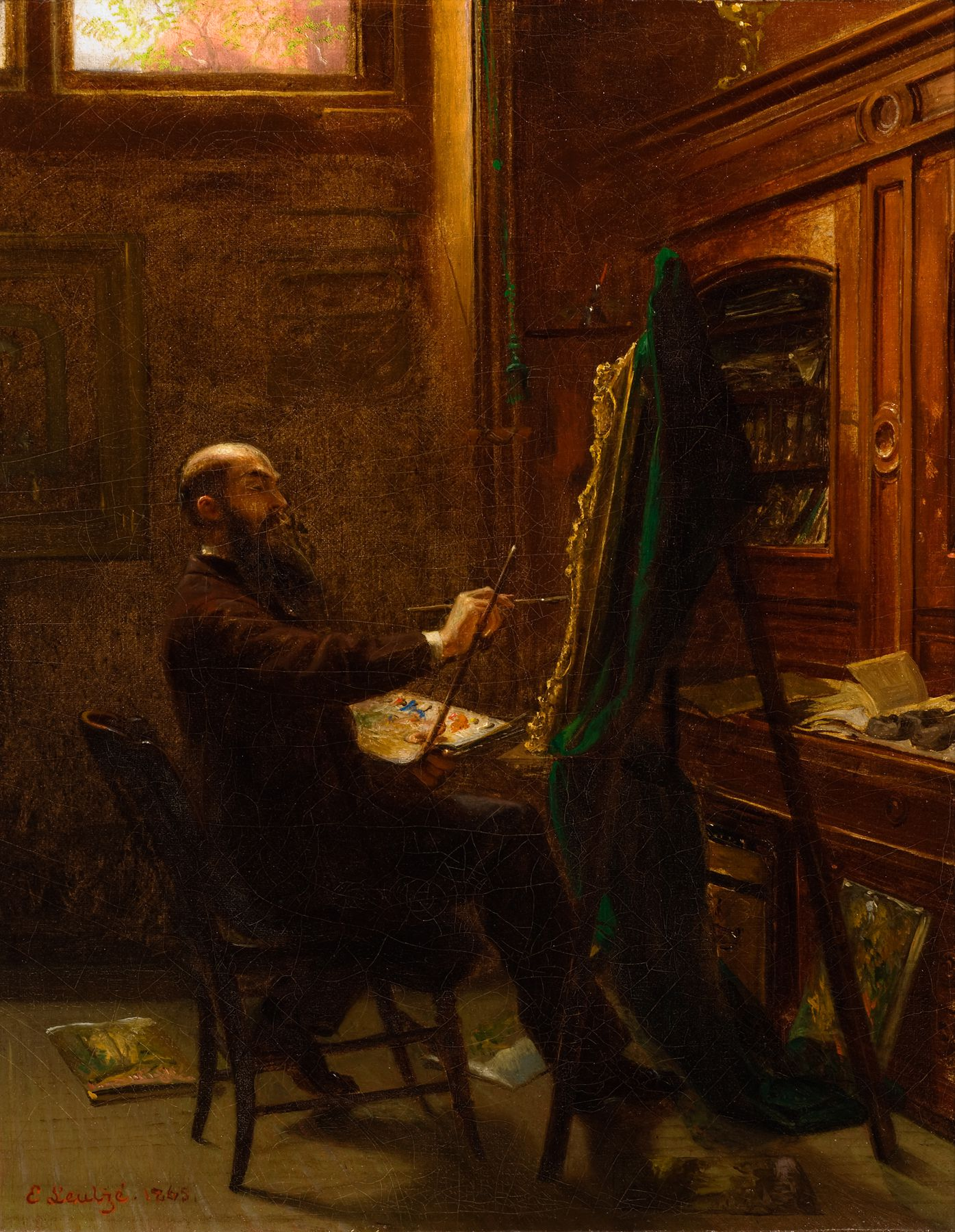
Emanuel Leutze, Worthington Whittredge in His Tenth Street Studio, 1865

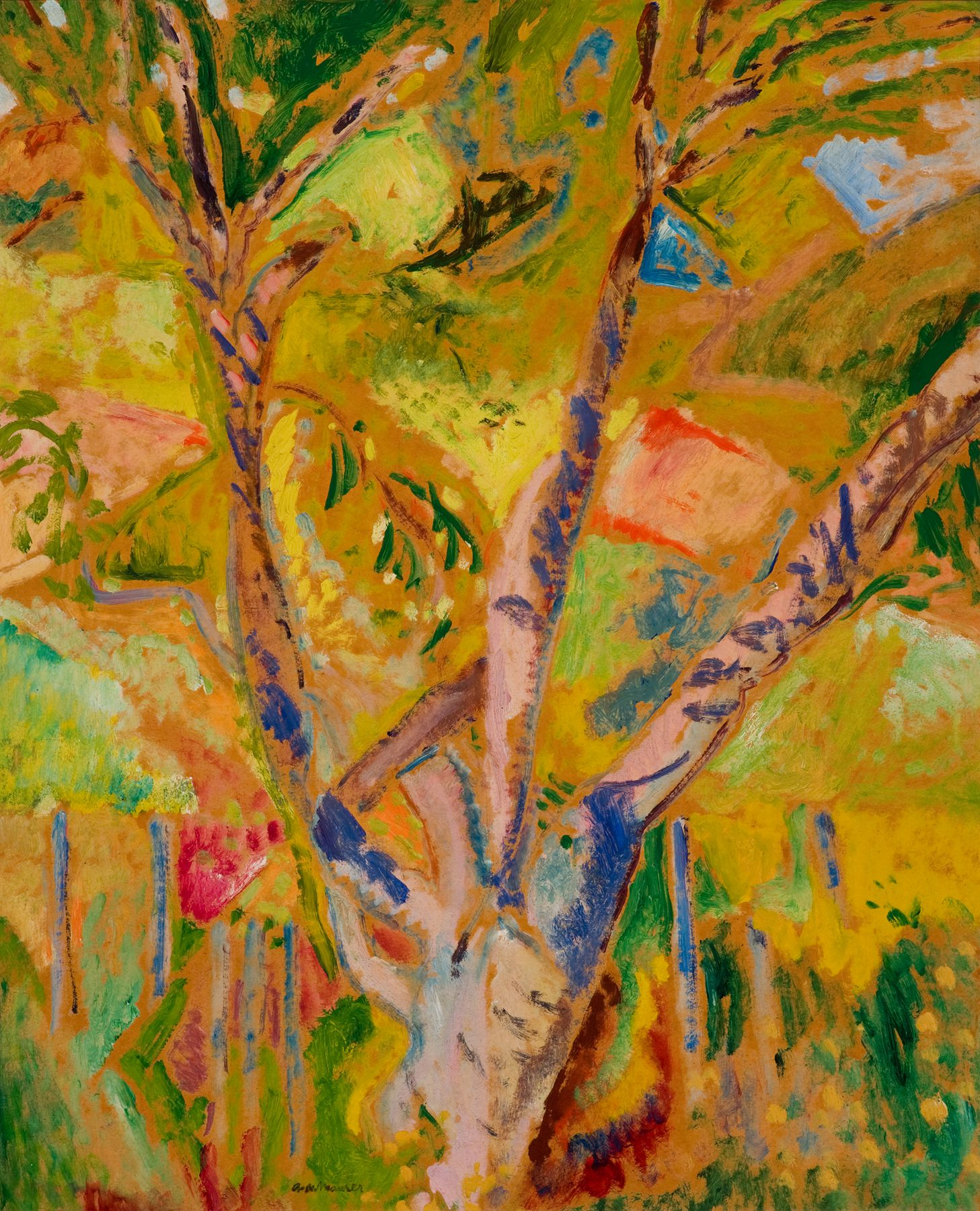
Alfred Henry Maurer, Landscape of Provence, c. 1912-1922

== Exhibitions ==
In 2005, Reynolda House opened the Mary and Charlie Babcock Wing which features a gallery space for traveling exhibitions. There are usually two shows featured in that space every year, one in the fall and one in the spring. There are other exhibitions throughout the year in the Northeast and West Bedrooms in the house.

=== Past exhibitions ===
- Love & Loss , October 11, 2014 - December 13, 2015
- Romare Bearden: A Black Odyssey, October 13, 2012 - January 13, 2013
- Domestic Bliss: Art at Home in Britain and America, 1780-1840, December 17, 2011 - May 20, 2012
- Modern Masters from the Smithsonian Art Museum, October 7, 2011 - December 31, 2011
- Trains that Passed in the Night: The Photographs of O. Winston Link, February 19, 2011 - June 19, 2011
- Virtue, Vice, Wisdom & Folly: The Moralizing Tradition in American Art, September 18, 2010 - December 31, 2010
- William Christenberry: Photographs, 1961-2005, February 13, 2010 - June 27, 2010
- The American Expatriates: Cassatt, Sargent, and Whistler, December 5, 2009 - April 5, 2010
- Now/Then: A Journey in Collecting Contemporary Art at Wake Forest University, October 31, 2009 - December 31, 2009
- The Andes of Ecuador: Science and Spectacle, September 26, 2009 - September 30, 2010
- Heroes of Horticulture, July 31, 2009 - September 27, 2009
- The Stieglitz Circle: Beyond O'Keeffe, June 6, 2009 - November 15, 2009
- Figures in Bronze: Sculpture at Reynolda, April 14, 2009 - August 30, 2009
- American Impressions: Selections from the National Academy Museum, February 28, 2009 - June 28, 2009
- Chuck Close: The Keith Series, January 17, 2009 - May 31, 2009
- Seeing the City: Sloan's New York, October 4, 2008 - January 4, 2009
- New World Views: Gifts from Jean Crutchfield and Robert Hobbs, May 20, 2008 - August 31, 2008
- Early American Portraits, May 13, 2008 - March 16, 2009
- Ancestry and Innovation: African American Art from the American Folk Art Museum, February 2, 2008 - April 13, 2008
- Wordplay: Text and Modern Art, November 13, 2007 - May 4, 2008
- Wings of Adventure: Smith Reynolds and the Flight of 898 Whiskey, September 8, 2007 - December 30, 2007
- A Country Takes Shape, June 27, 2007 - December 1, 2008
- The Art of Dance, April 3, 2007 - September 16, 2007
- Abstract/Object: Mid-Twentieth Century Art from the Reynolda House Collection, February 27, 2007 - June 17, 2007
- Grandma Moses: Grandmother to the Nation, January 27, 2007 - April 22, 2007
- Modern Fun! Prints from the '70s and '80s, October 3, 2006 - January 28, 2007
- Self/Image: Portraiture from Copley to Close, August 30, 2006 - December 30, 2006
- American Watercolors 1880 - 1965, July 1, 2006 - January 1, 2007
- Moving Pictures: American Art and Early Film, 1880-1910, March 10, 2006 - July 16, 2006
- J. M. W. Turner and Frederic Church: An Atlantic Conversation, November 15, 2005 - February 5, 2006
- Paper, Leather, Wood: Materials and African American Art of the Twentieth Century, November 15, 2005 - April 16, 2006
- Diane Arbus: Family Albums, September 15, 2005 - December 4, 2005
- Vanguard Collecting: American Art at Reynolda House, April 1, 2005 - August 21, 2005

== See also ==
- Reynolda Historic District, listed on the National Register of Historic Places
