= Thomas Warren Sears =

American landscape architect

Thomas Warren Sears (December 15, 1880 – June 1966) was a noted American landscape architect.

Sears was born in Brookline, Massachusetts, to Alexander Pomeroy Sears and Elizabeth Prescott (Jones). He received his A.B. in 1903 from Harvard College, followed in 1906 by his B.S. in Landscape Architecture as a member of Harvard's first graduating class in the field. After establishing an office in Providence, Rhode Island, Sears moved to Philadelphia, Pennsylvania, and by 1917 had begun his own practice there, where he remained for the rest of his career.

His works listed on the U.S. National Register of Historic Places include the Reynolda Historic District in Winston-Salem, North Carolina (Sears, Thomas Warren), and Graylyn.

== Selected landscapes ==
- Mt. Cuba Center
- Reynolda Gardens
- Scott Amphitheater, Swarthmore College
