= Charles Barton Keen =

American architect

- Keen pictured in 1928
- Born: December 5, 1868; Philadelphia, Pennsylvania, U.S.
- Died: February 12, 1931 (aged 62); Hamilton, Bermuda
- Occupation: Architect

Charles Barton Keen (December 5, 1868 – February 12, 1931) was an American architect, prominent in the late 19th and early 20th centuries. He was known for designing residences and country estates.

== Early life ==
Born in Philadelphia, Pennsylvania, in 1868, the youngest of the three sons of Charles Burtis Keen and Harriet Emily Ide.

He studied architecture at the University of Pennsylvania (UPenn), graduating in 1889. Upon returning from a sojourn to Europe, he worked for a year as a draftsman for Theophilus P. Chandler, the founder of UPenn's school of architecture, before working for his cousin Frank Miles Day, one of the three founders of House and Garden.

Keen also studied at the Pennsylvania Museum and School of Industrial Art between 1890 and 1892. One of his classmates was Frank E. Mead, whom Keen later worked with prior to Mead's departure for California.

His protégé in the early 20th century was William Roy Wallace.

== Career ==
Keen designed suburban residences and country estates for over thirty-five years, mostly along the Philadelphia Main Line. He became the architect of choice among the wealthy, including North Carolina tobacco magnate R. J. Reynolds. For Reynolds, he designed his Reynolda House residence, now a museum, in Winston-Salem, North Carolina. He partnered with landscape architect Thomas Sears on several projects.

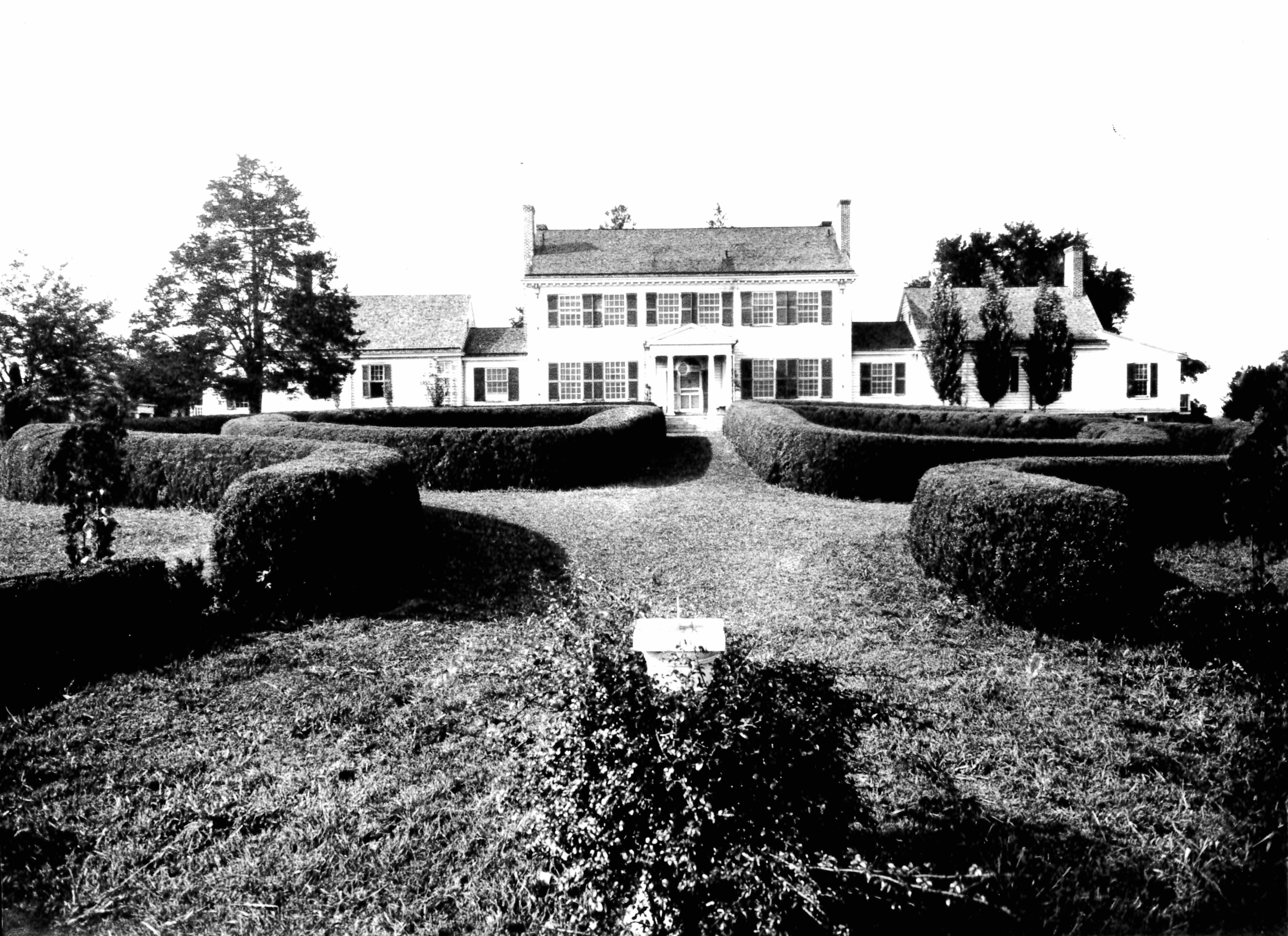
Lucy Henry Harrison House at Red Hill, 1912.

== Selected works ==
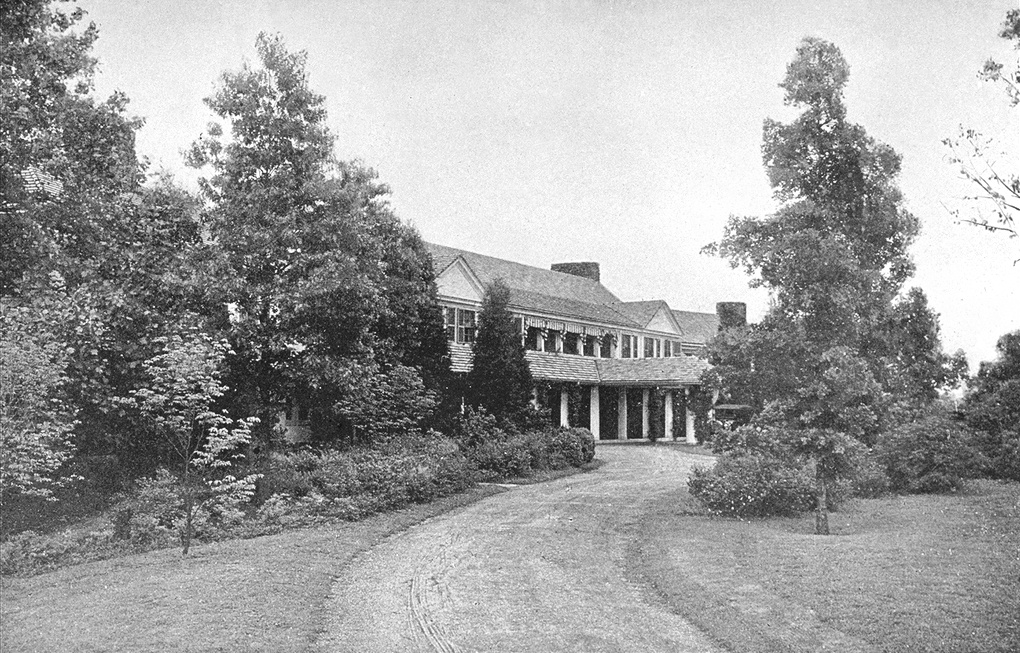
Reynolda House, c. 1915, during its construction

Keen was responsible for the following buildings:

- Swarthmore Lodge, Bryn Mawr, Pennsylvania
- Lasater House, Winston-Salem, North Carolina
- Lucy Henry Harrison House, Brookneal, Virginia (1911)
- Reynolda House, Winston-Salem, North Carolina (1912–1917)
- Alexander Worth McAllister House, Greensboro, North Carolina (1918–1919)
- Richard J. Reynolds High School, Winston-Salem, North Carolina

== Personal life ==
Keen was an accomplished golfer. As a member of Pine Valley Golf Club, he won his division at the 1920 winter tournament at Pinehurst, North Carolina.

In May 1923, at the request of Katharine Reynolds Johnston, Keen relocated his family from Pennsylvania to Winston-Salem. His business was based at the Wachovia Building. He returned north the following year, however, with Wallace joining him as partner.

Keen was a fellow of the American Institute of Architects.

== Death ==
Keen died of a stroke on February 12, 1931, while in Hamilton, Bermuda. He was 62, and had been ill since April 1929. He was interred in Woodlands Cemetery in Philadelphia.
