= Butler Island Plantation =

Former American plantation

- Butler Plantation
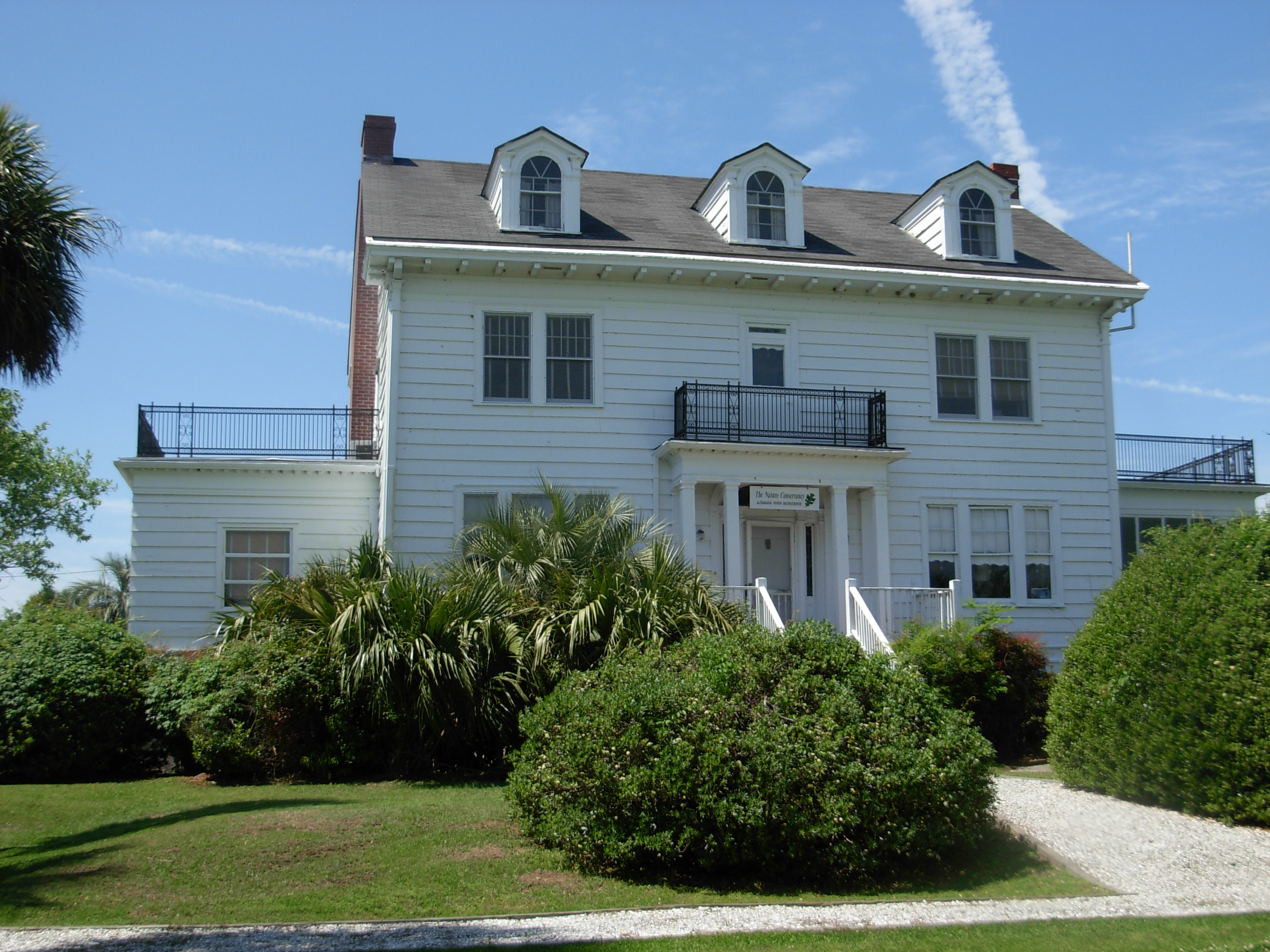
- Front (east side) of the Huston House

- Location within Georgia Location within the United States
- Interactive map of Butler Island Plantation
- Nearest city: Darien, Georgia
- Coordinates: 31.354725°N 81.446491°W
- Area: 1,500 acres (610 ha)
- Governing body: Georgia Department of Natural Resources

Butler Island Plantation was a former rice plantation located on Butler Island on the Altamaha River delta just South of Darien, Georgia. It was originally owned by Major Pierce Butler (1744–1822) and was also owned by Tillinghast L'Hommedieu Huston and then R. J. Reynolds Jr. The plantation is managed by the Georgia Department of Natural Resources.

The main structure remaining on the property, the Huston House (built 1927), was destroyed in a fire on June 26, 2024.

== History ==
Major Pierce Butler, who was one of the Founding Fathers of the United States and a supporter of slavery, owned the property in 1790. He ran the plantation until he died in 1822, when his unmarried daughter Frances became a trustee of the plantation, with the overseer, Roswell King, as her co-administrator. Upon the death of trustee Frances in 1836, controlling ownership shifted to Major Butler's two chosen heirs, grandsons of Butler's oldest daughter, who had made their permanent homes in Philadelphia.

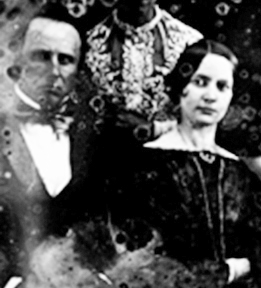
Pierce Mease Butler and Frances Kemble Butler

Following the resignation of the King overseers in 1838, grandson and co-heir Pierce Mease Butler traveled to the plantation with his wife and two daughters in December of that year. His wife, Frances Anne "Fanny" Kemble, was opposed to slavery and wanted to see and learn how the enslaved people lived. However, Butler hoped the visit would change her views on slavery. She had been told that the enslaved people were well-treated and never sold. She realized very quickly that this was not true. During her time there, she kept a diary and wrote about the horrific treatment and living conditions of the enslaved people. This time also marked the beginning of a significant schism between the married couple. Eventually, she published her writing, Journal of a Residence on a Georgian Plantation in 1838–1839, which is thought by some to have influenced the British against supporting the Confederacy during the Civil War.

On September 22, 1849, a Pennsylvania court granted Butler's petition to divorce Kemble and awarded custody of their daughters to Butler. During the years leading up to the Civil War, Butler became seriously in debt. In 1859, Butler auctioned off 436 of his enslaved men, women, children, and infants. The sale was located on what used to be the Ten Broeck Race Course, two miles outside Savannah, Georgia. The auction was (until the 2022 discovery of a larger auction) considered the largest slave sale in US history. Some enslaved people were held in buildings used for the stabling of horses. After days of buyers' inspections, and two days of the agonizing auction, families were separated for the first time in their lives. This would come to be known as the Weeping Time.

The plantation was abandoned when the American Civil War began. In 1866, Butler's daughter Frances returned with her father to attempt to restore the plantation to its former productivity. Unlike her younger sister Sarah who was aligned with her mother, Frances had adopted her father's pro-slavery views and kept a diary like her mother. She published it in 1883, titled Ten Years on a Georgia Plantation (ISBN 1-498-15893-5).

Due to the lack of slave labor, and the postwar depression in the Southern United States, plantations failed, and the fifth generation of Butlers sold the remains of their lands in 1923.

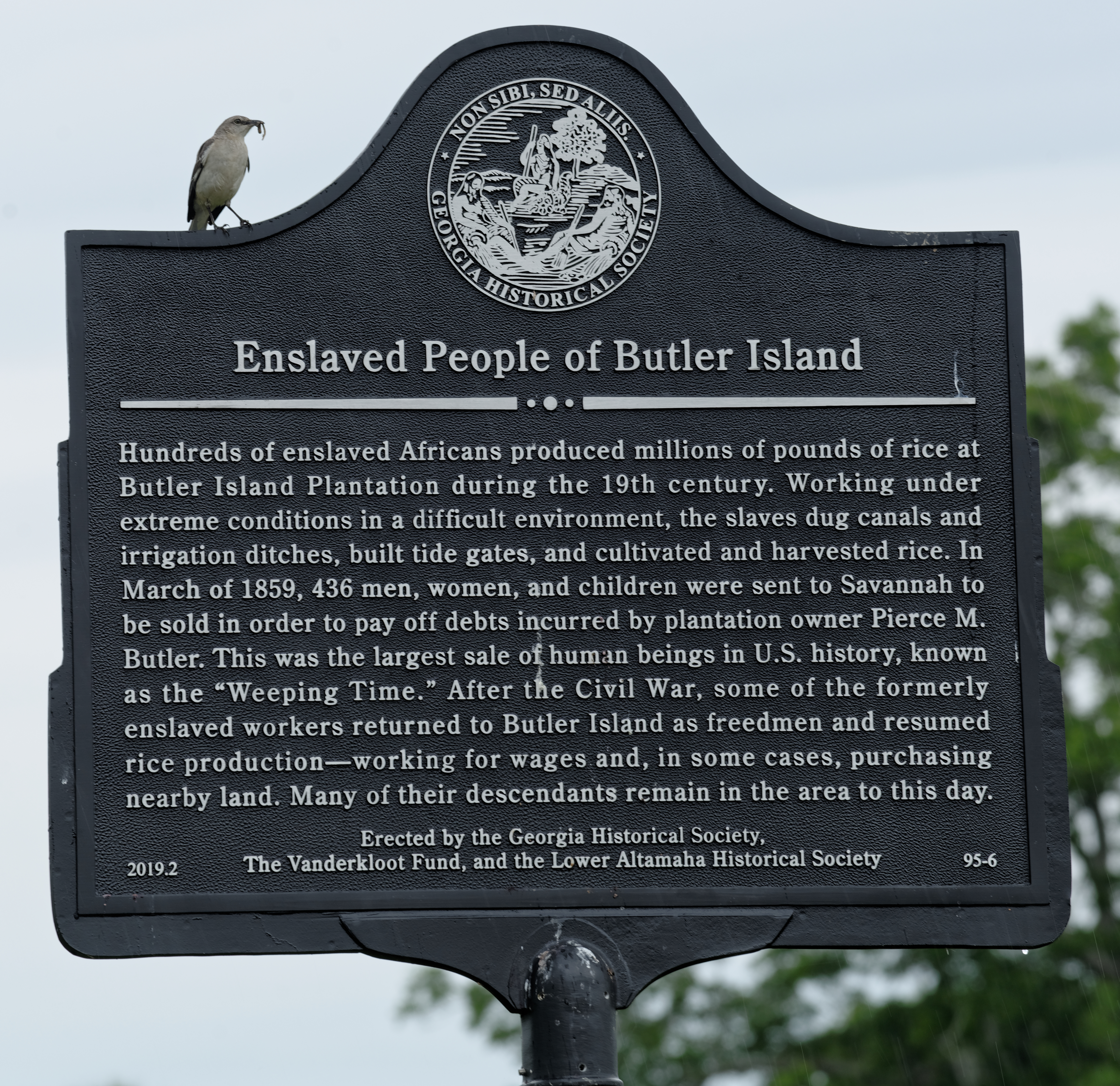
Historical marker about the Weeping Time

A description of the plantation from November 1873:

I am monarch of all I survey, which is an island of about 1,600 acres, surrounded by a muddy-looking river, called the romantic-sounding Indian name of the Altamaha. ... Our castle is a neat but not gaudy little frame house, with a piazza in front of it, from which you descend by six steps to a garden, or rather a small grove of orange trees, palmettoes, oleanders, and roses. The first-named are laden with golden fruit, of a quality unsurpassed anywhere in the world, I am bold to say, for size and sweetness. We are hard at work now packing them up for market, and shall have over 100 barrels for sale. The interior of the mansion is in accordance with its modest exterior; a small dining-room, a small drawing-room, a very small office or study, a small hall, a pantry, and two comfortable bedrooms on the ground-floor, and two more comfortable bedrooms over the dining and drawing-rooms. At the rear of the house about twelve yards, is what is called the colony, where are situated the kitchen, servants' sitting-room and bedrooms, the laundry and dairy, and in a corner of the yard is a turkey-house, full of prime Christmas fowl.

Behind the colony is Settlement No. 1, where the coloured people (I believe this is the correct term) reside. It consists of an avenue of orange trees, on each side of which are rows of wooden houses, and at the end of which, facing the avenue, is what was the old hospital, but which is now half of it the church. ... Immediately in front of our garden is the Altamaha river, with the landing-place for the boats, and from which all the water-supply is drawn. On the left of us is the overseer's house, a larger and more imposing edifice, although not so comfortable as ours. On the right are the barns and the threshing mill and engine, which are very nearly finished, and present a magnificent appearance from the river. The old mill, with all the valuable machinery, was burnt down a year ago. The rest of the island consists of rice-fields, of which about 1,000 acres are under cultivation or cultivable, some marsh land covered with thick bamboo and reeds, in which the wild duck do congregate, and some scrubby brushwood; also Settlements Nos. 2 and 3, an old rickety, but very large barn, a ruined mill, a ruined sugar-house.

Tillinghast L'Hommedieu Huston purchased the plantation in 1926. He converted it into a dairy and lettuce farm. He also built the Huston House on the property in 1927. After his death, the plantation was sold to R. J. Reynolds Jr.

Today the Georgia Department of Natural Resources manages the plantation. The area is open every day to the public for recreational activities.

In the late evening of June 26, 2024, The Huston House was destroyed in a fire. One person was arrested on suspicion of arson.

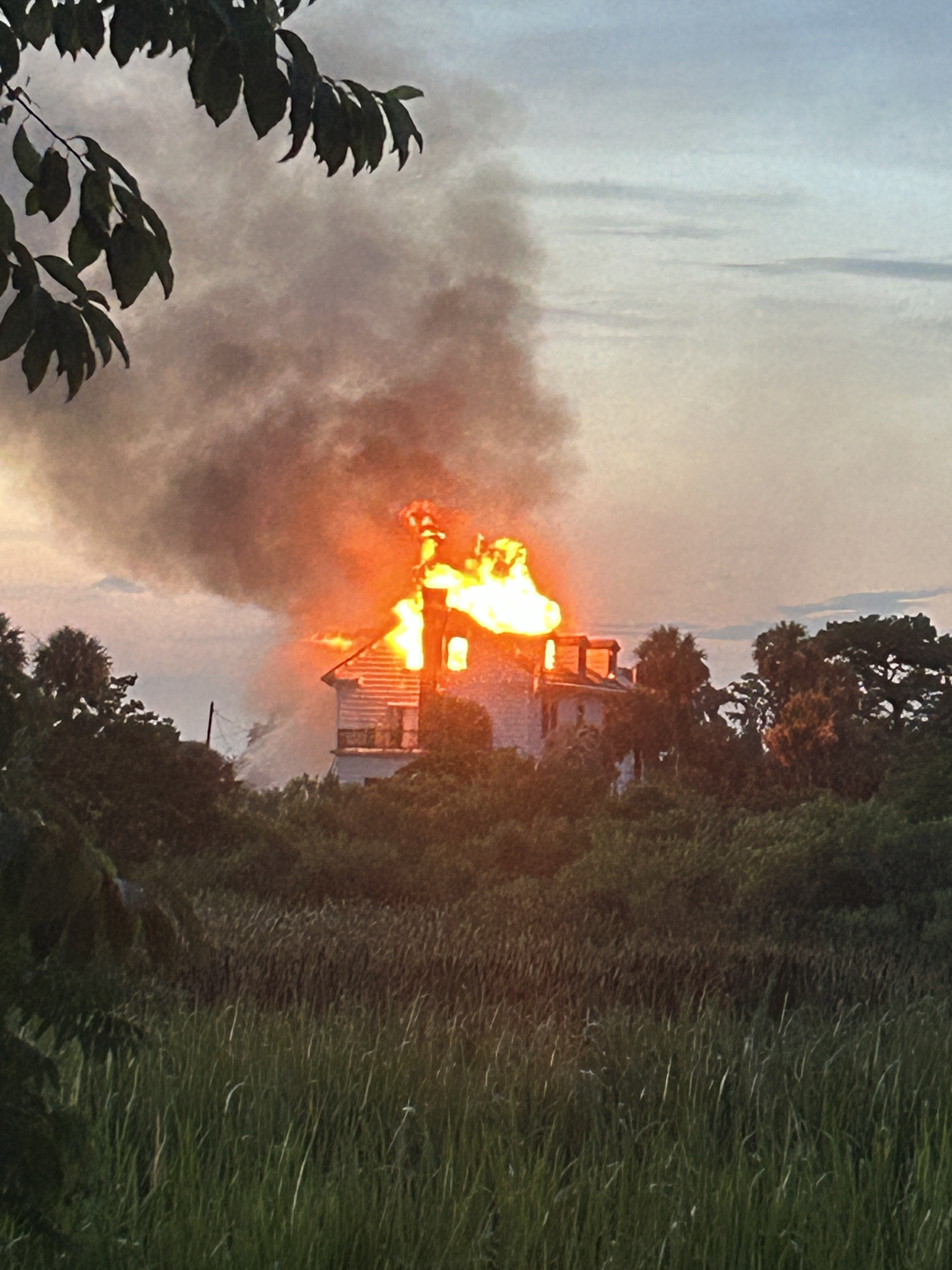
Butler Island Plantation fire

== Photos ==
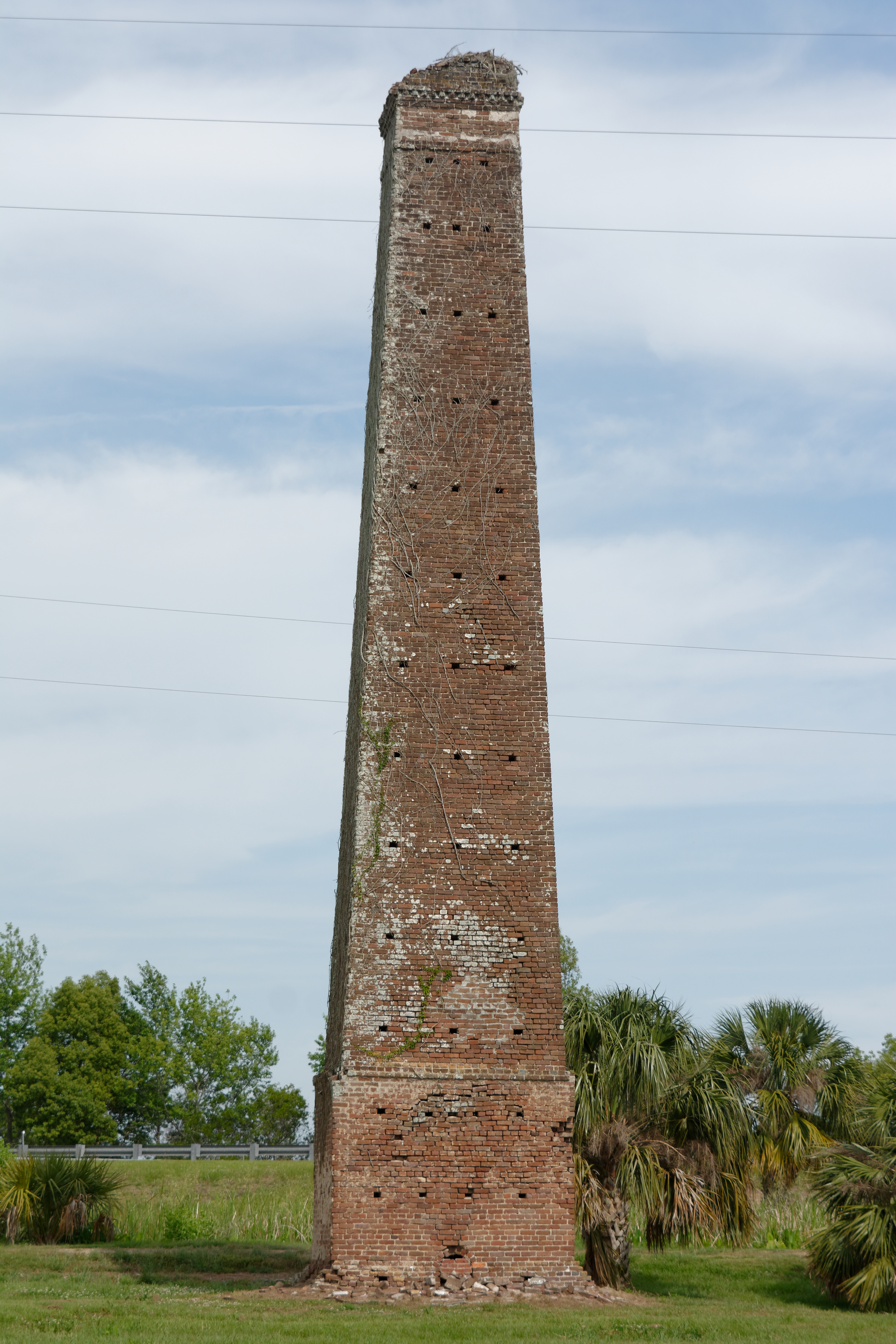
Remains of the steam-operated rice mill

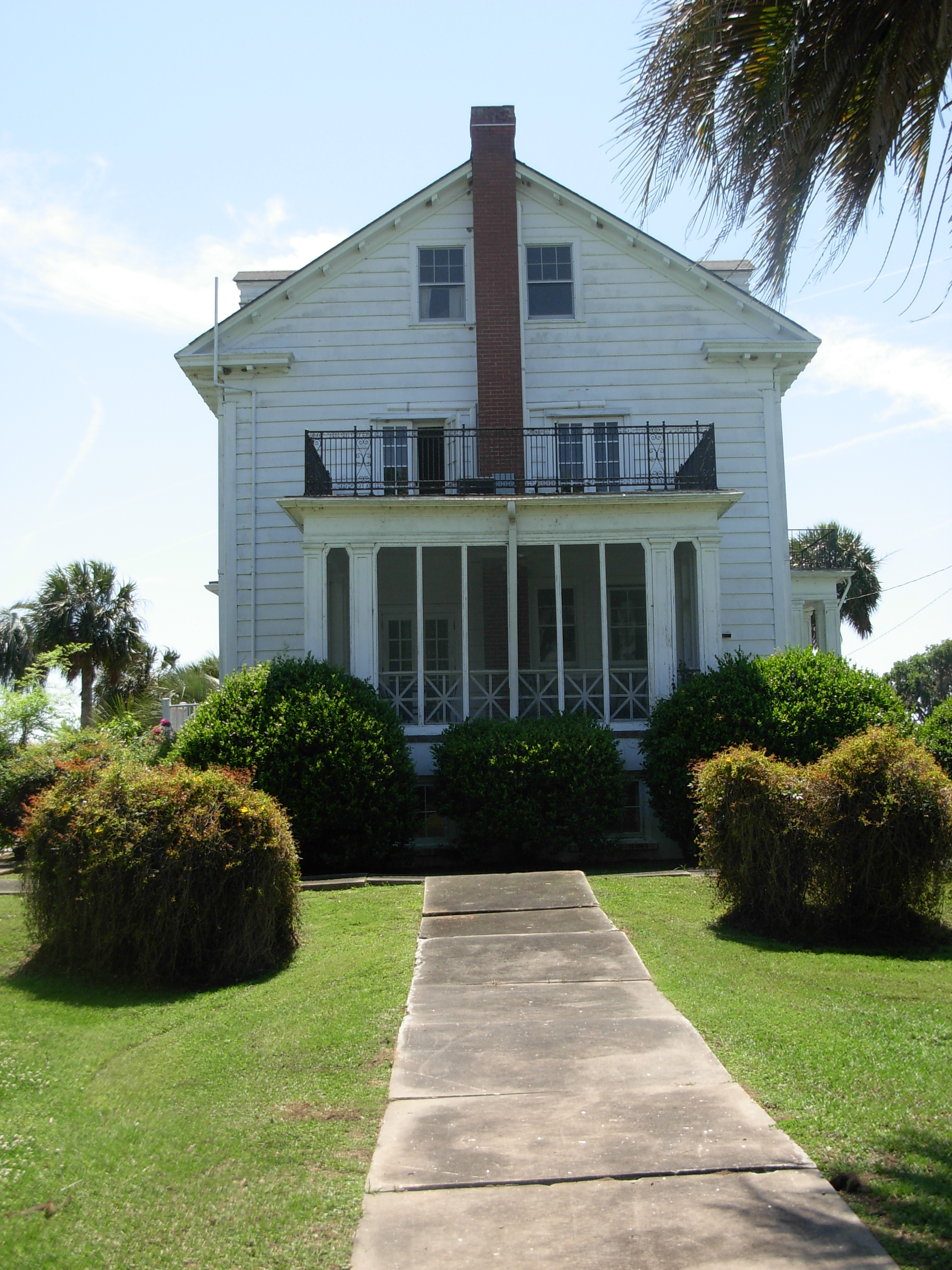
North side of the Huston house

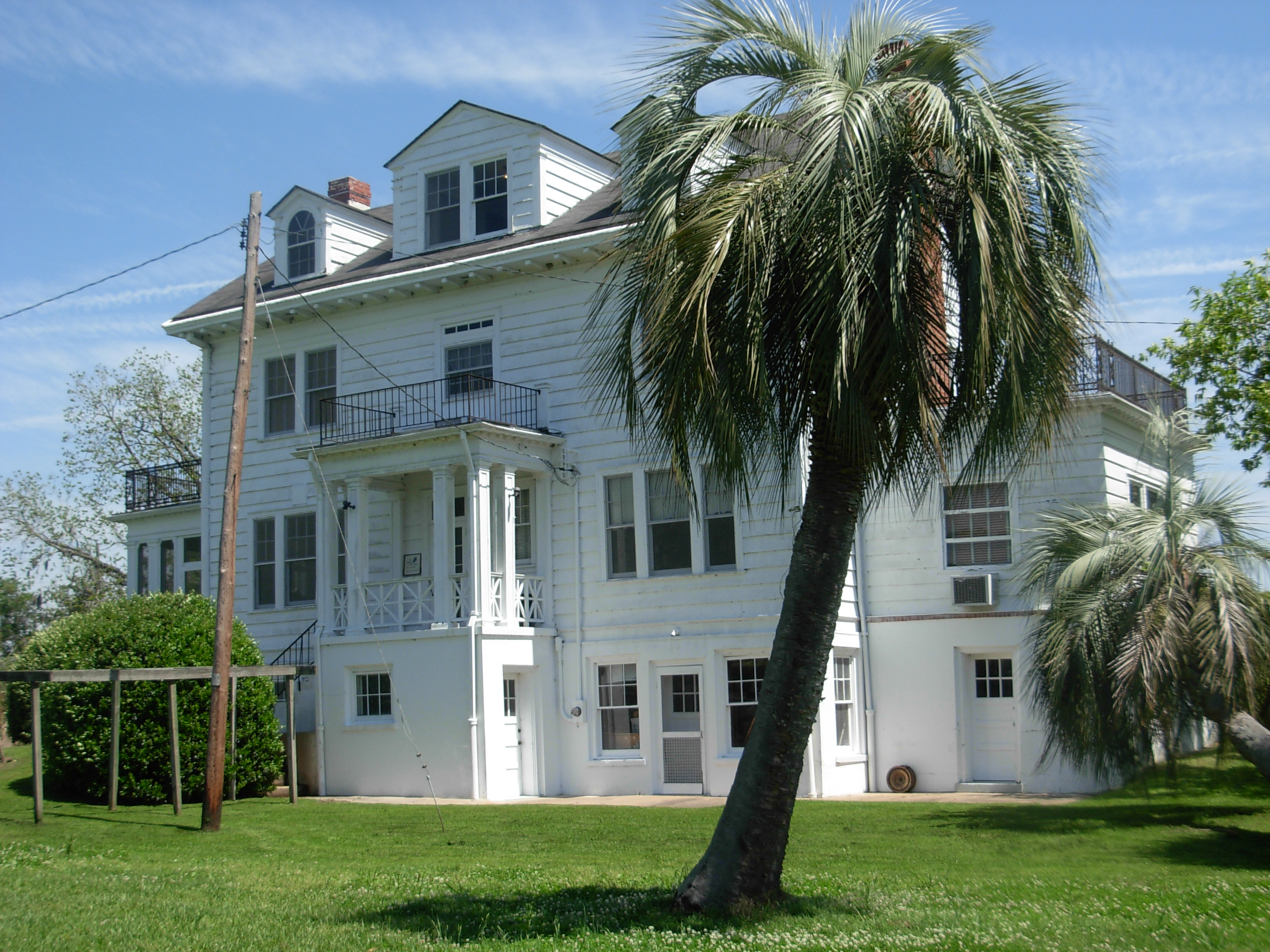
Back (west side) of the Huston house

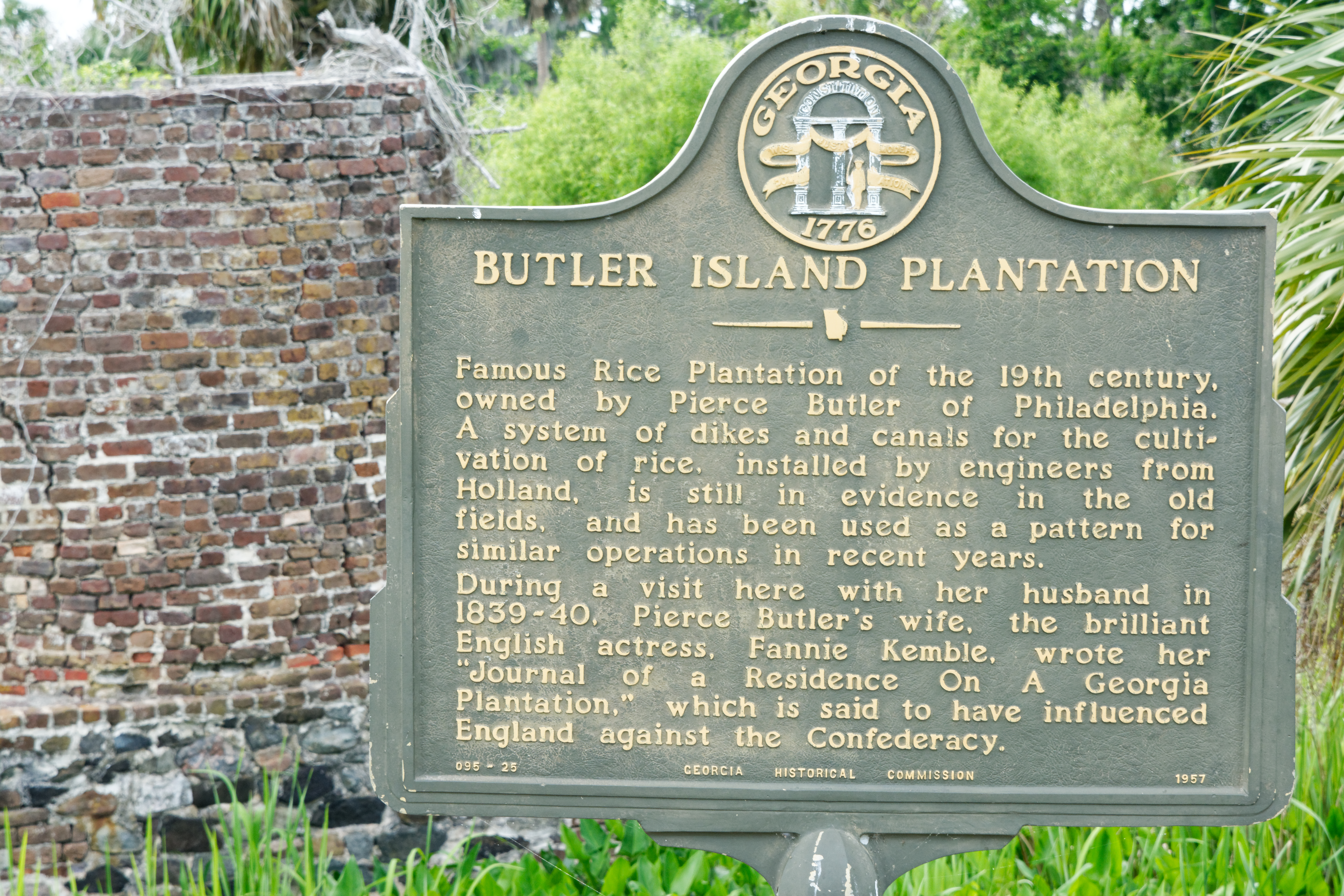
Historical marker

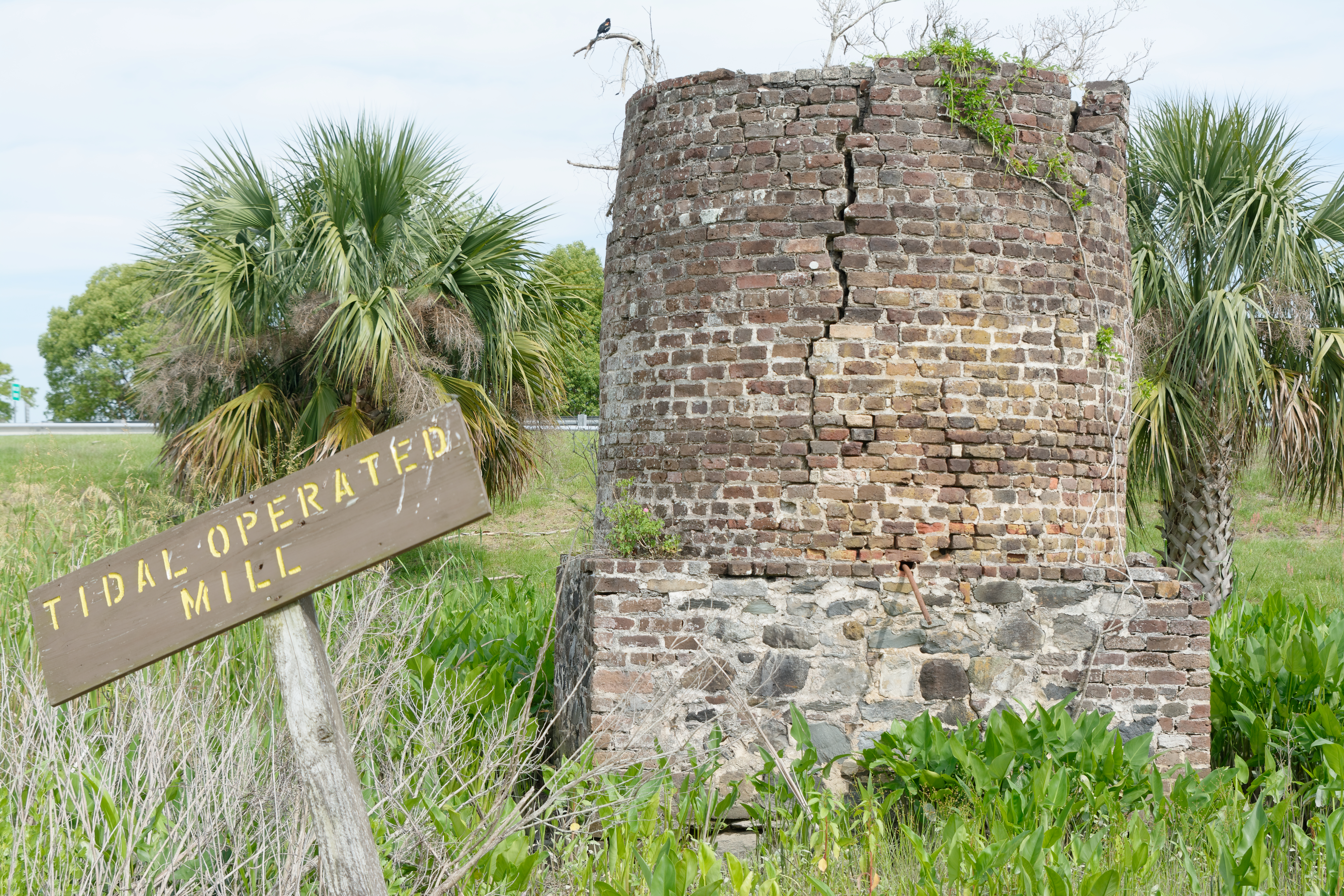
Boiler (brick cistern with hearth beneath)

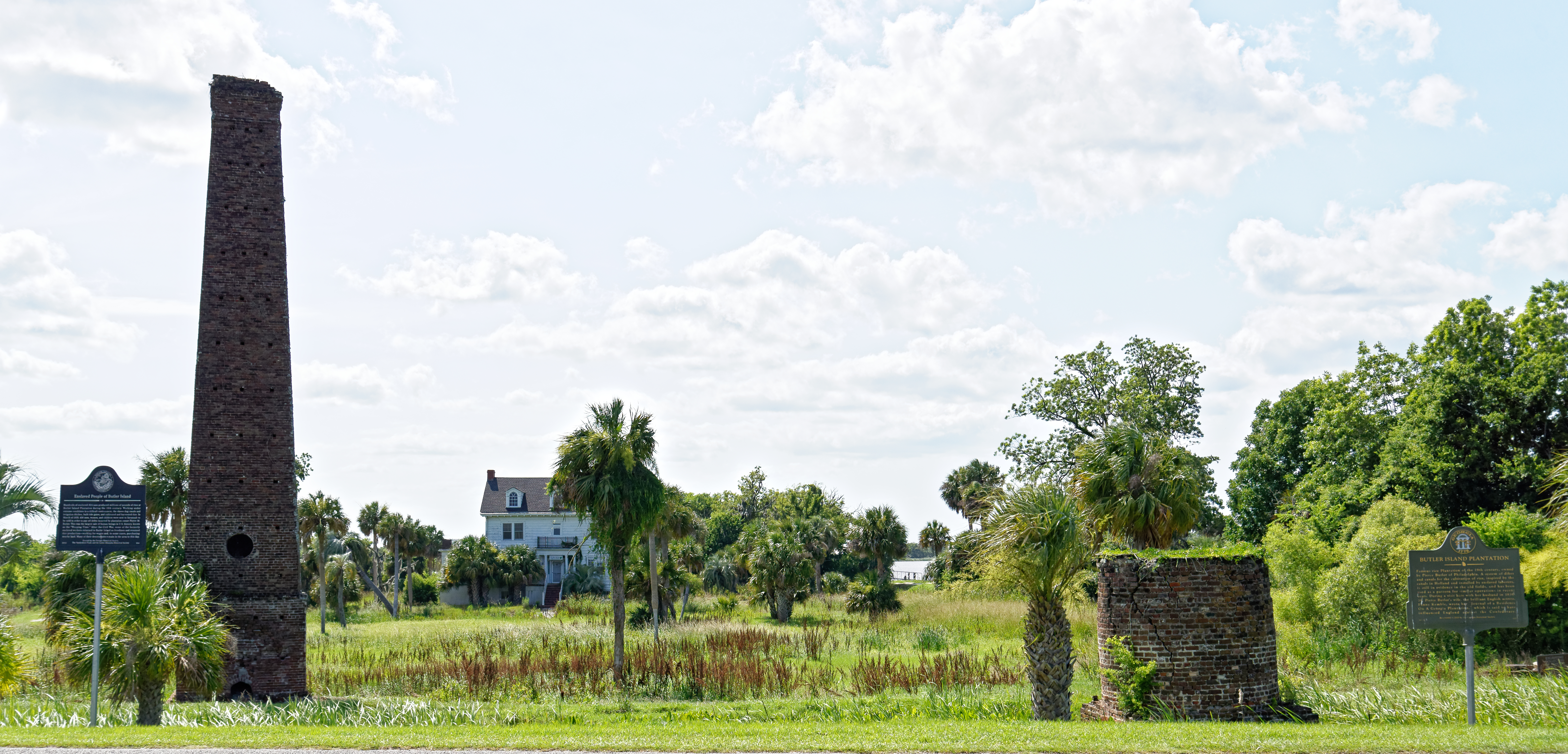
Two historical markers, remains of plantation structures, and the Huston house

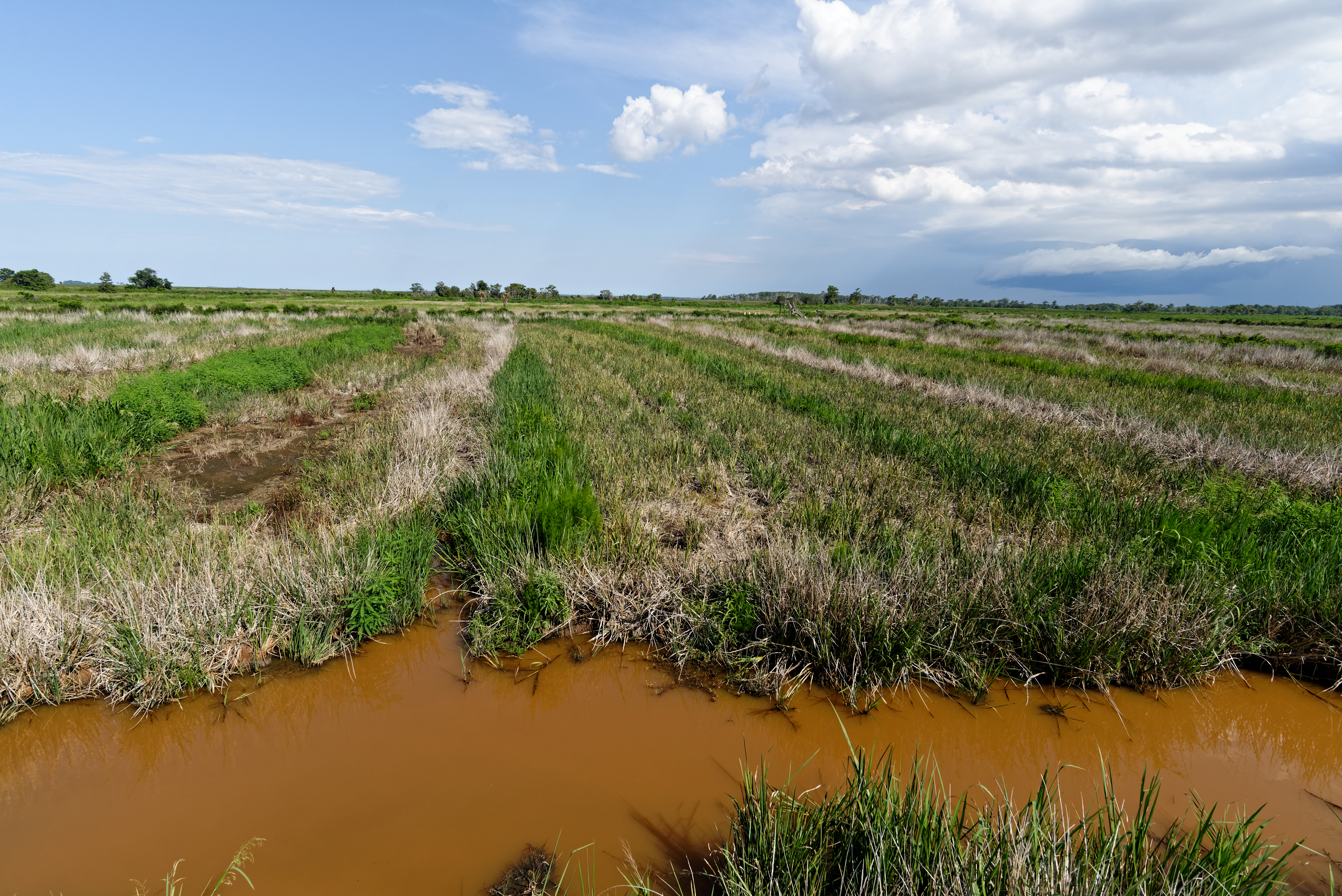
Rice fields; ditches are still visible

== See also ==
- Great Slave Auction
- Darien, Georgia
- Fanny Kemble
- Hofwyl-Broadfield Plantation - a nearby plantation
