= Butler Island =

Butler Island is the name of two islands:

- Butler Island (Antarctica)
- Butler Island (Georgia), United States
