= SS R. J. Reynolds =

World War II Liberty ship of the United States

History

United States
- Name: R.J. Reynolds
- Namesake: R. J. Reynolds
- Ordered: as type (EC2-S-C1) hull, MC hull 2377
- Builder: J.A. Jones Construction, Brunswick, Georgia
- Cost: $947,562
- Yard number: 162
- Way number: 4
- Laid down: 19 August 1944
- Launched: 30 September 1944
- Sponsored by: Mrs. Richard J.E. Reynolds Jr.
- Completed: 12 October 1944
- Identification: Call Signal: KSLD
- Fate: Laid up in National Defense Reserve Fleet, Wilmington, North Carolina, 11 January 1947; Sold for scrapping, 13 December 1957

General characteristics
- Class & type: Liberty ship; type EC2-S-C1, standard
- Tonnage: 10,865 LT DWT; 7,176 GRT
- Displacement: 3,380 long tons (3,434 t) (light); 14,245 long tons (14,474 t) (max)
- Length: 441 feet 6 inches (135 m) oa; 416 feet (127 m) pp; 427 feet (130 m) lwl
- Beam: 57 feet (17 m)
- Draft: 27 ft 9.25 in (8.4646 m)
- Installed power: 2 × Oil fired 450 °F (232 °C) boilers, operating at 220 psi (1,500 kPa); 2,500 hp (1,900 kW)
- Propulsion: 1 × triple-expansion steam engine, (manufactured by General Machinery Corp., Hamilton, Ohio); 1 × screw propeller
- Speed: 11.5 knots (21.3 km/h; 13.2 mph)
- Capacity: 562,608 cubic feet (15,931 m^{3}) (grain); 499,573 cubic feet (14,146 m^{3}) (bale)
- Complement: 38–62 USMM; 21–40 USNAG
- Armament: Varied by ship; Bow-mounted 3-inch (76 mm)/50-caliber gun; Stern-mounted 4-inch (102 mm)/50-caliber gun; 2–8 × single 20-millimeter (0.79 in) Oerlikon anti-aircraft (AA) cannons and/or, 2–8 × 37-millimeter (1.46 in) M1 AA guns

SS R.J. Reynolds was a Liberty ship built in the United States during World War II. She was named after R. J. Reynolds, founder of the R. J. Reynolds Tobacco Company.

== Construction ==
R.J. Reynolds was laid down on 19 August 1944, under a United States Maritime Commission (MARCOM) contract, MC hull 2377, by J.A. Jones Construction, Brunswick, Georgia; she was sponsored by Mrs. Richard J.E. Reynolds Jr., and launched on 30 September 1944.

== History ==
She was allocated to Black Diamond Steamship Co., on 12 October 1944. On 11 January 1947, she laid up in the National Defense Reserve Fleet in Wilmington, North Carolina. On 13 December 1957, she was sold for $88,636, to Boston Metals Scrap Company, for scrapping. She was removed from the fleet on 8 February 1958.

== Bibliography ==
- "Jones Construction, Brunswick GA". ShipbuildingHistory.com. 13 October 2010.
- "Liberty Ships – World War II".
- Maritime Administration. "R.J. Reynolds". Ship History Database Vessel Status Card. U.S. Department of Transportation, Maritime Administration. Archived from the original on 12 December 2019.
- Davies, James (May 2004). "Specifications (As-Built)" (PDF). p. 23.
- "SS R.J. Reynolds".
