= Butler Island (Georgia) =

Island in McIntosh County, Georgia, United States

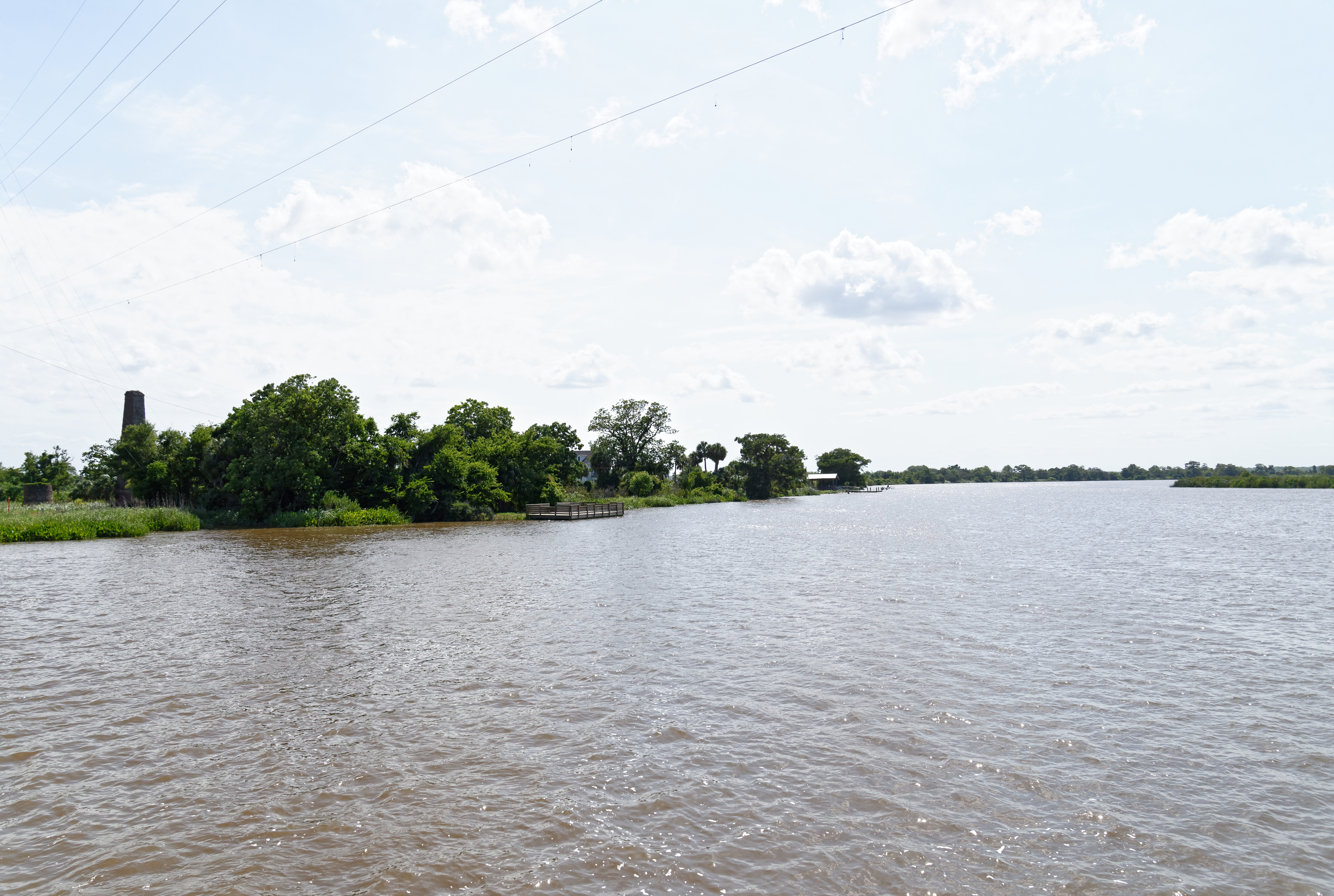
- The Butler River, with Butler Island on the left. Taken from the US Route 17 bridge.

- Location within Georgia Location within the United States
- Interactive map of Butler Island

Geography
- Location: McIntosh County, Georgia
- Coordinates: 31°21′32″N 81°28′04″W

Administration
- United States

Butler Island is a 1,600-acre (647.5-hectare) island in the Altamaha River in McIntosh County, Georgia, United States. Part of the Altamaha River Delta, the island is located 1 mi (1.6 km) south-southeast of Darien, Georgia.

The Altamaha River divides in the delta, and the northernmost branch is 3.1 mi (5.0 km) long and called the Butler River. This flows north of the boomerang-shaped Butler Island. Interstate 95 crosses the west section of Butler Island. US Route 17 crosses Butler Island's east section, connecting it to General's Island and Darien.

A local landmark is the 75 ft (23 m)-tall brick chimney of the Butler Island Plantation rice mill.

== Major Butler ==
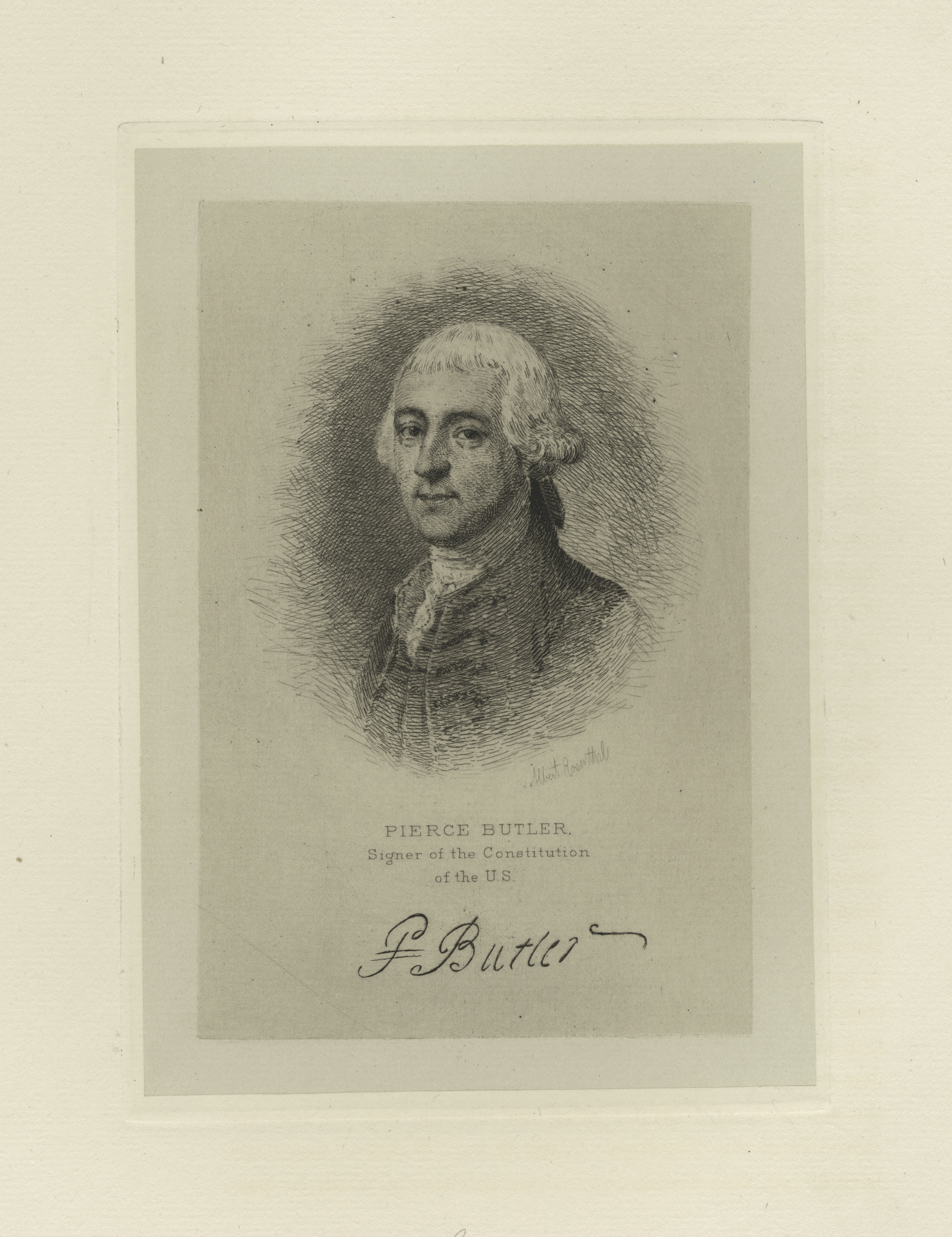
Pierce Butler

Butler Island was named for its original owner, Pierce Butler, a Founding Father and a U.S. Senator from South Carolina.

Butler was the third son of an Irish baronet and an officer in the British Army, who came to the Thirteen Colonies to quell a 1768 uprising in Boston. He married Mary Middleton in 1771, an heiress from a South Carolina slaveholding family. He took the American side in the Revolutionary War, serving as Adjutant-General of the South Carolina Militia. He was one of South Carolina's four delegates to the 1787 Constitutional Convention, at which he was an ardent defender of slavery. He served in the U.S. Senate from 1789 to 1796 and returned to fill out an unexpired term, 1803–1804.

=== Georgia plantations ===
Following his wife's 1790 death, Major Butler sold off the last of their South Carolina holdings and invested in Georgia Sea Island plantations. The plantations initially were worked by his enslaved South Carolinians, but he purchased 80 enslaved Virginians in 1801 and a group of enslaved recently shipped from West Africa in 1802. The West Africans had experience in rice-growing and learned enough English to be added to the workforce in 1803. In the early decades, the cash crop was the cotton grown on St. Simon's Island, but as Hampton's soil became depleted, the cash crop became the rice grown on Butler Island.

Roswell King managed Major Butler's Georgia plantations from 1802 to 1819. He conducted a slave census in 1803, listing 540 enslaved people by name and rating each by their ability to labor—a "quarter," "half," "three-quarters," or "full" hand. Most plantations had a white overseer, with a trusted black "headman" or "driver" working under him. At its height, the Butler Island Plantation had a white overseer, a black "head driver," and four "drivers."

Major Butler was a stern disciplinarian, governing the slaves on his plantation with military strictness. The Butler plantations were models of efficiency. Everything needed was manufactured on the plantation from shoes and clothes to furniture and tools. After a visit to Butler's Island, Sir Charles Lyell wrote: "The negro houses were neat and whitewashed, all floored with wood, each with an apartment called the hall, two sleeping rooms, and a loft for the children." Sea Island cotton was the main crop at Hampton, while rice was cultivated at Butler's Island.

Five months after his burning of the White House in the War of 1812, British Admiral George Cockburn sailed into the Altamaha River Sound, in January 1815. He offered freedom to the enslaved Africans held by Major Butler on St. Simon's Island, and 138 of them accepted the offer. The British Navy transported the newly-freed to Nova Scotia and assigned them the surname "Butler."

Major Butler became the largest slaveholder in coastal Georgia, "owning as many as a thousand slaves and cultivating three plantations—Hampton on St. Simons Island, Butler Island in the Altamaha River opposite Darien; and Woodville, several miles further up the Altamaha above Butler's Island." Woodville was used to grow corn and raise livestock for the plantations.

Hampton was located on St. Simon's Island, about 10 mi (16 km) downstream from Butler Island. The Butler Island and Hampton plantations operated as a unit. About 60% of the enslaved were housed in four settlements on Butler Island. Cultivation of rice required more strenuous work than cotton, and the Butler Island workforce was younger and stronger. Because of the threat of malaria, pregnant women, many children, older workers, and the infirm were housed at Hampton, which was considered healthier. Between 1819 and 1834, "over half of the children at Butler Island had succumbed [to death] before age six."

Roswell King, Jr. succeeded his father, managing the Butler plantations from 1819 to 1838, and from 1841 to 1853.

At the time of his February 15, 1822 death in Philadelphia, Major Butler held 638 enslaved Africans on the Georgia plantations.

== Rice production ==
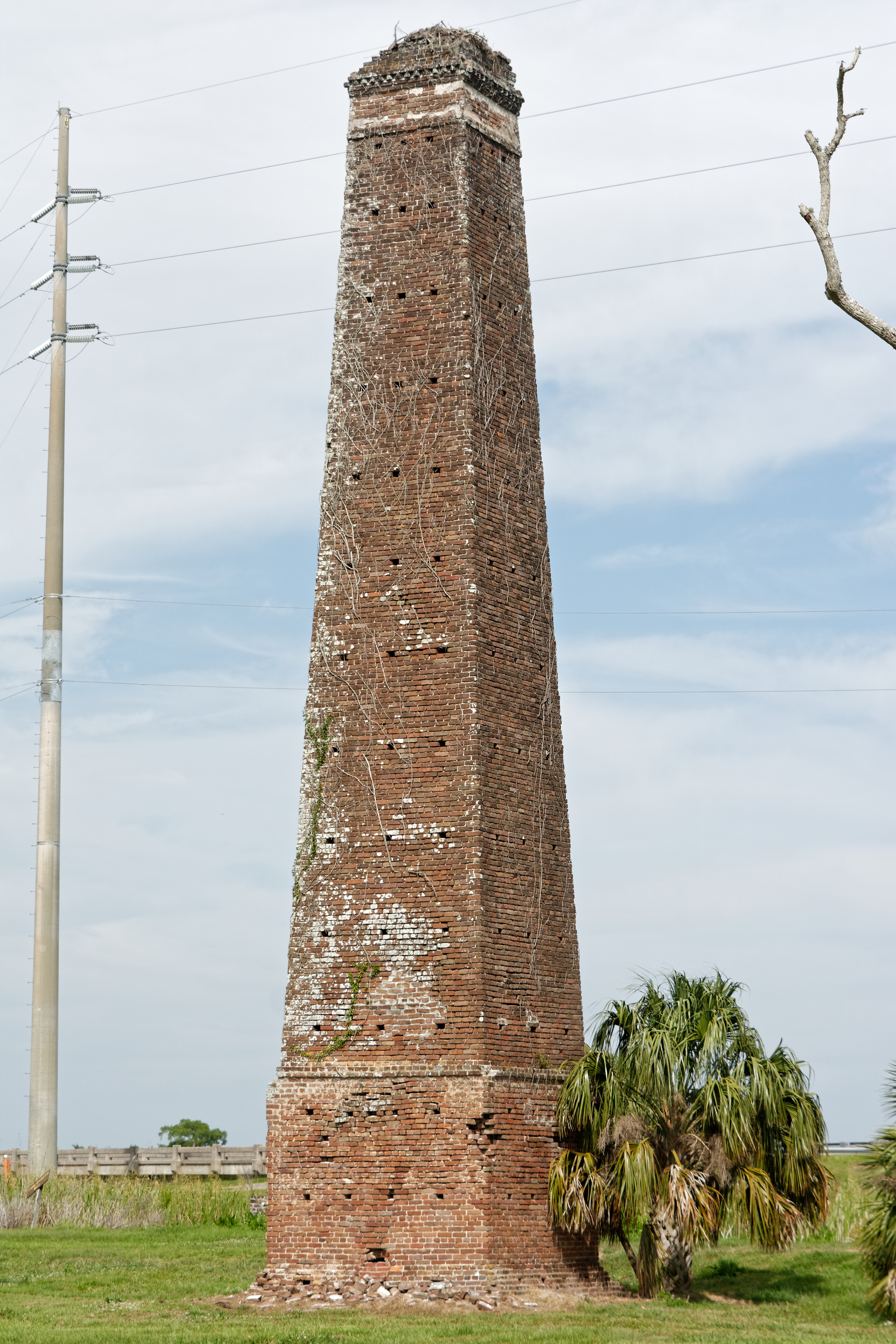
Rice mill chimney, 1832–1833, Butler Island Plantation

Rice was grown in sunken, flooded fields, and required complex freshwater management to maximize the yield. Dikes were built around the paddies to keep out the brackish water that surrounded them at high tide.

In tidewater Georgia, rice was usually ready to harvest in late August, when the grains started hardening. The flooded paddies were drained, and workers used small sickles to sever each stalk at the base. The stalks were bound into sheaves and stacked in ricks for the rice to cure. The stalks were cut away, and the cured rice boiled in vats, dried, and threshed to separate the kernels from the chaff. The kernels then were pounded using wooden mortar and pestles to loosen the hulls, the hard outer coating of each grain. The pounded kernels then were carried in tightly-woven baskets up a ladder into the winnowing barn, a small building atop tall stilts. The pounded kernels were scattered out through a trap door in the floor, for the wind to blow away the hulls as the heavier brown rice fell into a pan on the ground. The brown rice was "polished" into white rice by soaking it in vats to loosen the bran, the thin inner coating of each grain. The wet brown rice was kneaded until the bran and germ separated from the white grain.

The pounding with mortar and pestle was the most exhausting physical labor. To relieve this, Roswell King attempted to build a pounding mill in 1803. This was to be powered by the tidal movements of the river but building a solid foundation in the spongy soil proved difficult and having to wait until hours when the tides were moving limited the mill's efficiency. By 1816, a water-powered mill was functioning, and two pounding machines were pounding the rice kernels. "All phases of producing the rice crop, except the pounding, were done by hand."

=== Steam mill ===
I have been over the rice mill, under the guidance of the overseer and headman Frank, and have been made acquainted with the whole process of threshing the rice, which is extremely curious. The number of hands employed in this threshing mill is very considerable, and the whole establishment, comprising the fires, and boilers, and machinery of a powerful steam engine, are all under Negro superintendence and direction. — Fanny Kemble, 1838.

The decision to build a steam-powered mill was made in 1832. Roswell King Jr. had wooden pilings pounded into the highest section of Butler Island, the plantation yard beside the Butler River landing, to bear the weight of the 14-horse-power steam engine and its brick chimney. The mill was completed in December 1833 and exposed problems in the production line. The threshing and winnowing tasks done by the workers were quickly outpaced by the pounding and polishing tasks powered by the steam engine. None of the threshing workers could keep up, and the steam engine was shut down to give them a break. Similarly, winnowing required wind to blow away the hulls, so the steam engine was idle on windless days. The coopers fell behind in making tierces (small barrels) to pack the processed rice. The steam engine required a steady supply of wood for fuel, so more acres of pine forest were purchased. The steam engine was resented by the workers, creating "a perpetual monotonous burden," as Fanny Kemble described it.

== Butler family ==
Major Butler disinherited his only surviving son, Thomas, along with Thomas's French-born wife and daughter. The only one of the Major's four daughters to have married and borne children was Sarah, who married Dr. James Mease of Philadelphia in 1800. In his will, Major Butler directed that Sarah Butler Mease's sons would be his heirs if they irrevocably changed their surnames to "Butler." Her younger son, Pierce Butler Mease, upon attaining his majority in 1831, legally changed his name to Pierce Mease Butler. Her elder son, John A. Mease, resisted doing so when he attained his majority. He married Gabriella Morris in 1827, and their son Pierce, born in 1829, lived only a year. Their second child, Elizabeth (1830-1862), was excluded from inheriting because of her gender. Sarah Butler Mease died in February 1831. In December, John A. Mease followed his brother's lead and legally changed his surname to "Butler." Each inherited a half-interest in Major Butler's plantations and enslaved Africans.

=== Pierce Mease Butler ===
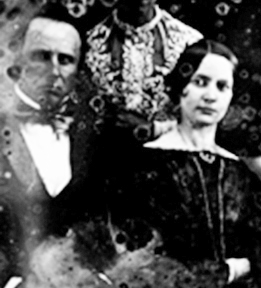
Pierce Mease Butler and Fanny Kemble

Pierce Mease Butler married British actress Fanny Kemble in 1834. She and their two young daughters spent their first winter with him at Butler Island in 1838. Kemble believed that she could persuade Butler to give up slaveholding, but was wrong. She complained about plantation manager King, Jr. having fathered children by enslaved women, but her husband refused to do anything about it. Kemble's first-person experience with slavery inspired her memoir: Journal of a Residence on a Georgian Plantation in 1838–1839. The couple separated in 1847, and Butler divorced Kemble in 1849. He prevented her from seeing their daughters for years.

John A. Butler was captain of Philadelphia's First City Troop and served in the Mexican–American War. He saw no action and died of dysentery in camp on December 23, 1847. Like his grandfather, John A. Butler used the terms of his will to impose control long beyond his death. His estate was in trust for his widow Gabriella (provided she never remarried), and his 17-year-old daughter, Elizabeth. John A. Butler named his brother Pierce and his fellow First City trooper Dr. Thomas C. James as executors and trustees of his estate. The trust would be dissolved, and his estate settled only after Elizabeth married and produced a son who lived to his majority and legally changed his surname to "Butler." Should these conditions not be fulfilled, the estate would go to his brother Pierce or Pierce's eldest son. (Pierce Butler had only daughters.) Elizabeth Butler married Julian McAllister in 1848, but both sons died before attaining majority. All three of the McAllister daughters lived long lives but, like their mother, were excluded from inheriting.

In his will, John A. Butler also directed that his interests in the Georgia plantations be sold. Nevertheless, his brother Pierce and widow Gabriella used his estate to expand those interests. In August 1853, Pierce and the John A. Butler estate jointly bought the adjacent 700-acre (283-hectare) plantation on General's Island. In July 1854, Elizabeth Butler, the only surviving child of Major Butler, died in Philadelphia. "Aunt Eliza" had held a life interest in the plantations; her death triggered the clause in John A. Butler's will that his interests in them be sold. The never-married Eliza also left a bequest to Pierce Butler, which enabled him to buy out most of his brother's share in the plantations. The John A. Bulter estate retained a half-interest in the enslaved Africans on the plantations, but none of the land.

In 1844, the Butler Island rice mill produced up to a million pounds of processed rice annually. With the addition of the General's Island plantation, the mill's output increased to two million pounds per year in the mid-1850s.

==== Great Slave Auction ====
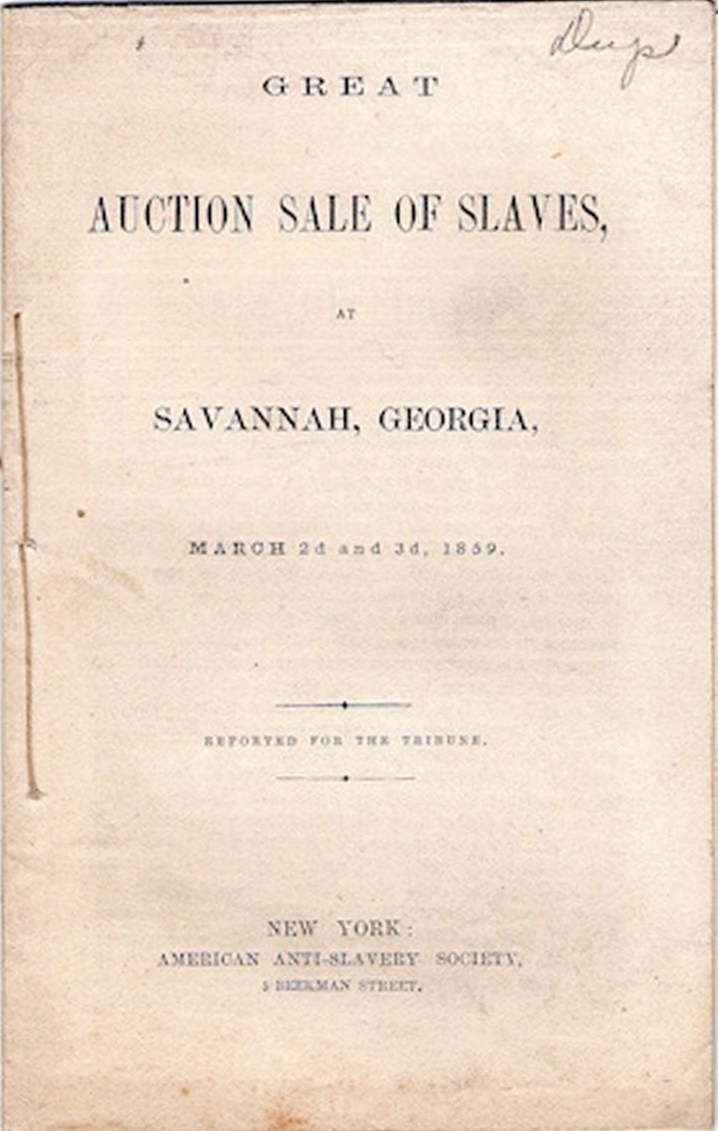
Pamphlet of Mortimer Thomson's account of the 1859 Great Slave Auction

SALE OF SLAVES.

The largest sale of human chattels that has been made in Star-Spangled America for several years, took place on Wednesday and Thursday of last week, at the Race-course near the City of Savannah, Georgia. The lot consisted of four hundred and thirty-six men, women, children and infants, being half of the negro stock remaining on the old Major Butler plantations which fell to one of the two heirs to that estate. Major Butler, dying, left a property valued at more than a million of dollars, the major part of which was invested in rice and cotton plantations, and the slaves thereon, all of which immense fortune descended to two heirs, his [grand]sons, Mr. John A. Butler, sometime desceased, and Mr. Pierce M. Butler, still living, and resident of the City of Philadelphia, in the free State of Pennsylvania. Losses in the great crash of 1857-8, and other exigencies of business, have compelled the latter gentleman to realize on his Southern investments, that he may satisfy his pressing creditors. This necessity led to a partition of the negro stock on the Georgia plantations, between himself and the representative of the other heir, the widow of the late John A. Butler, and the negroes that were brought under the hammer last week were the property of Mr. Pierce M. Butler, of Philadelphia, and were in fact sold to pay Mr. Pierce M. Butler's debts. The creditors were represented by Gen. Cadwalader, while Mr. Butler was present in person, attended by his business agent, to attend to his interests. — Mortimer Thomson, The New York Tribune, March 9, 1859.

Pierce Butler squandered a fortune estimated at $700,000 but was saved from bankruptcy by selling half of the 919 Africans enslaved on the plantations.

The Great Slave Auction was held on March 2–3, 1859, at Ten Broeck Race Course outside Savannah, Georgia. Butler sold 436 enslaved Africans in the largest single sale in American history. Most of the enslaved were transported by train, but a group went by steamboat from Darien to Savannah. All were housed in the racetrack's stables, where prospective bidders were given the four days leading up to the auction to inspect them. "The slaves were sold off in family groups of two to seven persons each … [and] brought $303,850, or an average of more than $708 per head."

Mortimer Thomson, a reporter for the New York Tribune, traveled to Savannah and posed as a bidder, questioning the enslaved people and attending both days of the auction. His extended account, by turns snide and sympathetic, was printed in the Tribune on Monday, March 9, and caused such a sensation that it was reprinted on March 11. It also was reprinted in newspapers in other Northern U.S. cities and as a pamphlet by the American Anti-Slavery Society.

The sale erased most of Pierce Butler's debts but still left him owing about $127,000, including $59,925 to his late brother's estate. The 1860 U.S. Census listed 505 Africans enslaved on Butler Island, all the property of the John A. Butler estate.

==== Civil War ====
Pierce Butler spent the American Civil War in Philadelphia. He had been in Georgia at the April 1861 outbreak of the war and returned to Philadelphia in August. He was charged with treason, and detained at Fort Hamilton, Brooklyn, New York City, August–September 1861.

In February 1862, the United States Navy imposed a blockade of the Altamaha River, occupying St. Simon's Island and Butler Island. Two regiments of U.S. Colored Troops—the 2nd South Carolina Infantry, under Col. James Montgomery, and the 54th Massachusetts Volunteer Infantry Regiment, under Col. Robert Gould Shaw—landed on St. Simon's Island in early June 1863. Montgomery was the senior officer, and on June 11, he ordered his regiment to loot the deserted town of Darien. Shaw committed only one of his companies to the looting and limited them to items that would be useful in camp. Once looted, Montgomery ordered Darien burned to the ground. Shaw wrote his parents: "I told him I did not want to take the responsibility of it, and he was only too happy to take all of it on his own shoulders." Shaw later described the raid as a "Satanic action."

The enslaved Africans on the Butler plantations nominally gained their freedom in 1863, by the Emancipation Proclamation. The military occupation of Butler Island and St. Simon's Island lasted into 1866.

=== Post-war ===
The daughters of Pierce Butler and Fanny Kemble held opposing views on slavery. Sarah Butler (1835-1908) married Dr. Owen Jones Wister of Philadelphia in 1859 and kept a diary during the early years of the war. She shared the abolitionist views of her mother, whose Journal of a Residence on a Georgian Plantation in 1838-1839 was finally published in 1863. Frances "Fan" Butler (1838-1910) was close to her father and shared his pro-slavery views.

Pierce Butler and his daughter Fan returned to Georgia in March 1866 to reclaim the plantations. She wrote that all the enslaved who the John A. Butler estate had held remained on the properties, and seven of those who had been auctioned in 1859 returned to them. The formerly enslaved people agreed to work as sharecroppers in exchange for sharing the rice crop, 50-50. Pierce Butler committed to supporting the elderly until their deaths and three years of support for young children.

Pierce Mease Butler died in Georgia of malaria in August 1867.

==== Frances Butler Leigh ====
Fan Butler took over the management of the plantations. About 300 workers tended the rice on Butler Island, and about 50, the cotton on St. Simon's Island. Her contracts with formerly enslaved people required approval by the Freedmen's Bureau. She paid workers $12 monthly plus food, clothing, and shelter. She converted an existing Butler Island building into a school, infirmary, and church and hired a black graduate of a Pennsylvania seminary as instructor/minister.

An English cousin on the Butler side, Rev. James Wentworth Leigh, visited Butler Island in November 1869. Fan Butler and her sister traveled to England the following summer and visited the Anglican minister. The couple's engagement was announced in December, and they were married in England in June 1871. The Leighs remained there until their return to Georgia in the autumn of 1873.

During Fan Butler's absence, the rice mill, steam engine, along with related buildings were destroyed in a fire, presumed to have been arson: "By this fire about fifteen thousand dollars' worth of property was destroyed, including all our seed rice for the coming planting." The Leighs returned to Butler Island in November 1873, and rebuilt the mill.

Rev. Leigh conducted services for the free-black workers in the school. These led to his conducting services in a barn in Darien and the founding of an African-American Episcopal congregation in 1875. Frances Butler Leigh donated Darien town lots inherited from her father, and its congregants constructed St. Cyprian's Episcopal Church, which was dedicated in 1876.

Rev. & Mrs. Leigh returned to England in January 1877.

Sarah Butler Wister's son, novelist Owen Wister (1860-1938), inherited his mother's half of the plantations. He was the last family member to own land on Butler Island and sold off the last of the properties in 1923.

== Colonel Huston ==
Tillinghast L'Hommedieu Huston purchased the Butler Island Plantation in 1926. Huston converted it into a dairy and lettuce farm. He also built the Huston House on the property in 1927.

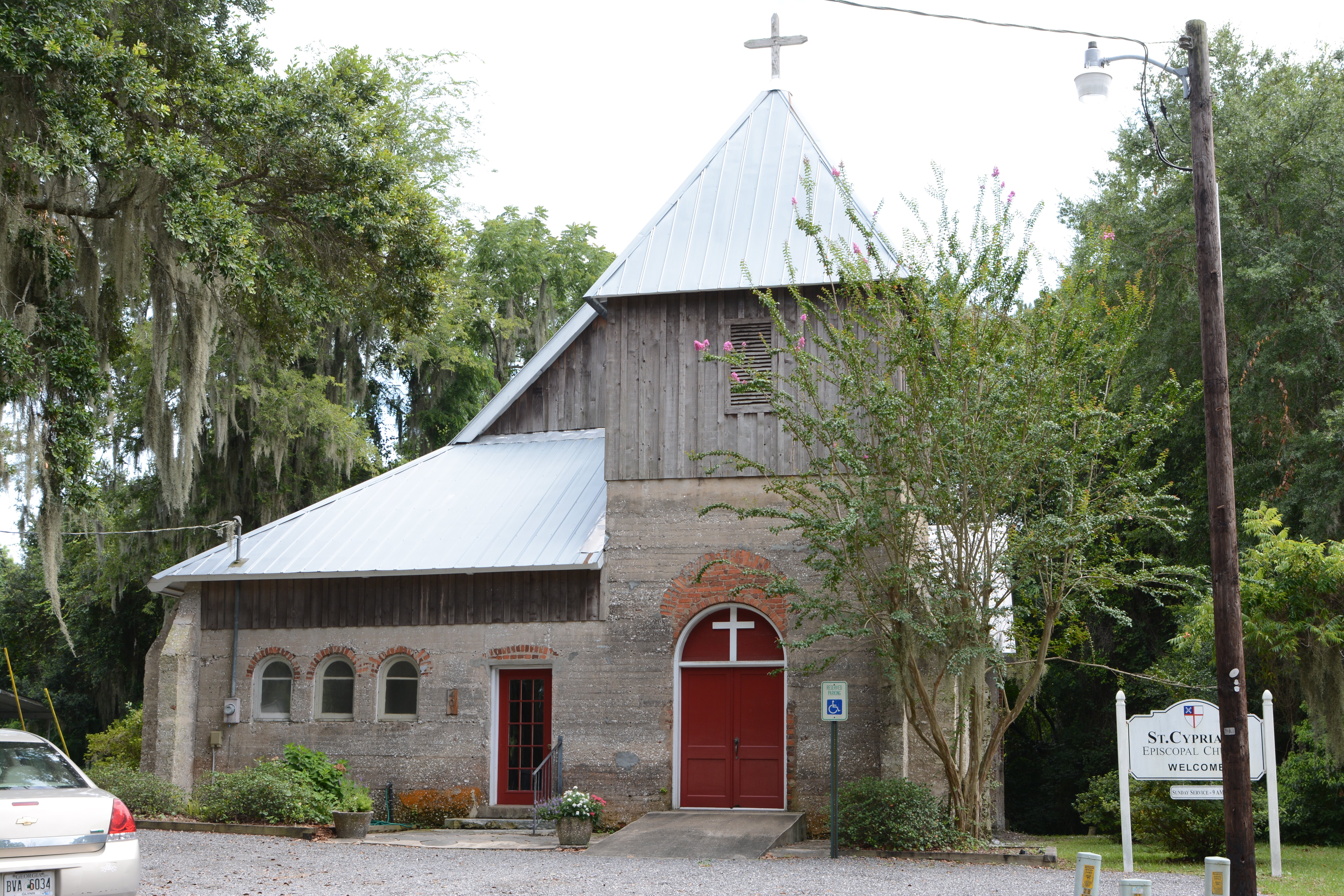
St. Cyprian Episcopal Church, Darien, Georgia

== See also ==
- Butler Island Plantation
