= R. J. Reynolds Jr. =

American businessman

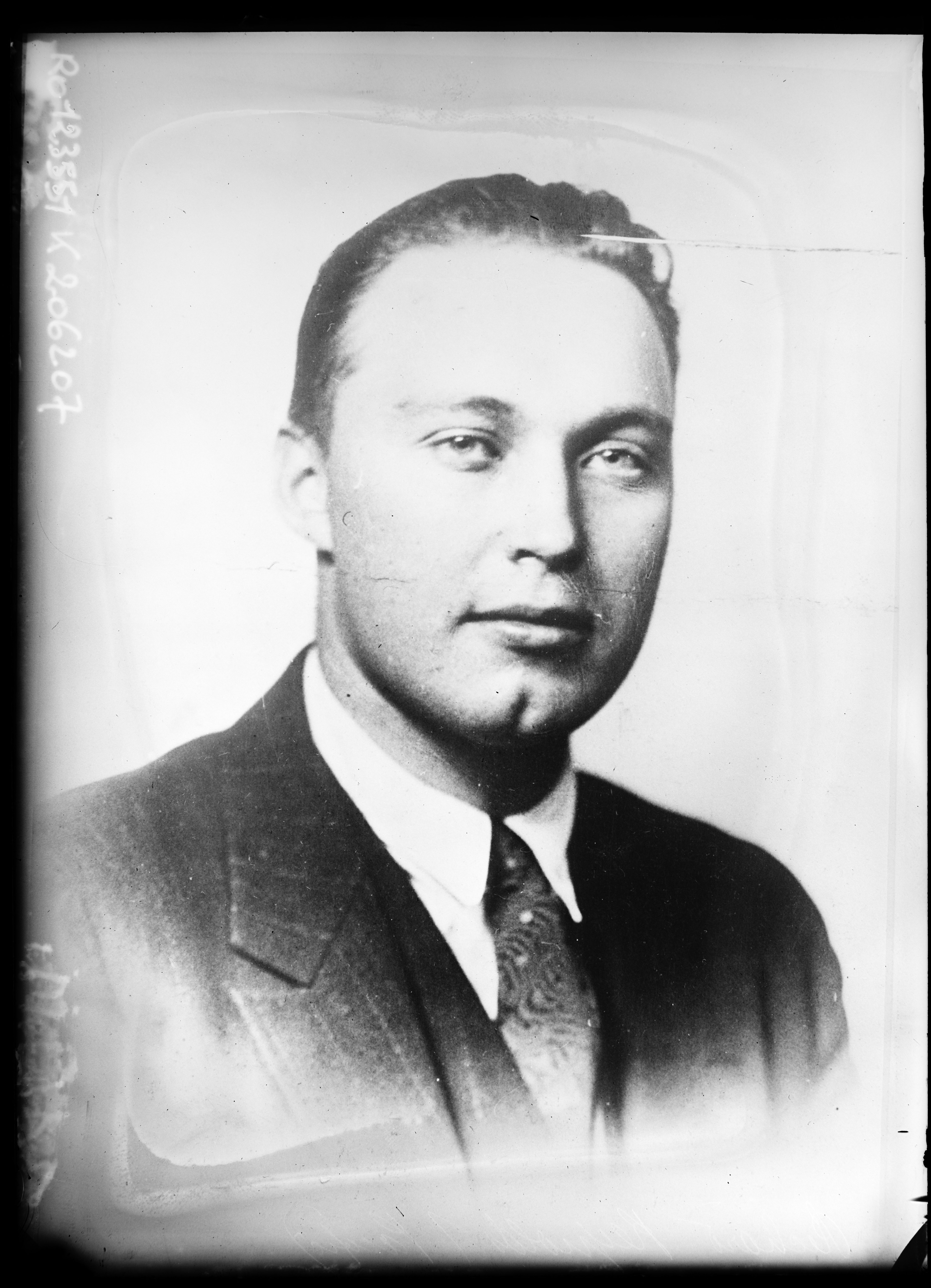

Treasurer of the Democratic National Committee
- In office January 4, 1941 – October 4, 1942
- Preceded by: Oliver A. Quayle Jr
- Succeeded by: Edwin W. Pauley

Mayor of Winston-Salem, North Carolina
- In office May 12, 1941 – June 1942
- Preceded by: James R Fain
- Succeeded by: J. Wilbur Crews

Personal details
- Born: Richard Joshua Reynolds Jr. April 4, 1906 Winston-Salem, North Carolina, U.S.
- Died: December 14, 1964 (aged 58) Lucerne, Switzerland

Richard Joshua Reynolds Jr. (April 4, 1906 – December 14, 1964) was an American entrepreneur and the son of R.J. Reynolds, founder of the R.J. Reynolds Tobacco Company.

== Biography ==
Reynolds was an American businessman, politician, activist and philanthropist.

In 1934, he acquired Sapelo Island on the Atlantic coast of Georgia and, following the death of Tillinghast L'Hommedieu Huston in 1938, the Butler Island Plantation

Reynolds was appointed treasurer of the Democratic National Committee in early 1941 before being elected mayor of Winston-Salem, North Carolina, a few months later. He took a leave of absence from his mayoral duties and resigned his treasurer post in 1942 when he began military service as a lieutenant at the Naval Combat Intelligence School in Quonset Point, Rhode Island.

As a businessman, he did not work at R. J. Reynolds Tobacco Company except as a young teenager and was involved in creating Delta Air Lines. He was also a yachtsman (having the 125 ton ketch Aries built for him in 1952), pilot, aviator, and philanthropist.

== Family life ==
Reynolds had four sons with his first wife, socialite Elizabeth McCaw Dillard: Richard Joshua Reynolds III (1933–1994), John Dillard Reynolds (1935–1990), Zachary Taylor Reynolds (1938–1979), and William Neal Reynolds (1940–2009). From his second marriage to the Hollywood stage and movie actress, Marianne O'Brien, his sons were: the activist Patrick Reynolds, and Michael Randolph Reynolds (1947–2004). His third marriage was to Muriel Marston Greenough, the younger sister of Anthony Heselton Marston, who was a major Canadian industrialist. His first three marriages ended in divorce. His fourth marriage, in 1961, was to Dr. Annemarie Schmitt, a psychiatrist.. They had a daughter born just after his death.

== Death ==
Reynolds was diagnosed with emphysema in 1960 and died four years later in Switzerland.

== See also ==
- Arca Foundation
