= Tinryland =

Village in County Carlow, Ireland

Tinryland Tigh an Réileáin
- Village
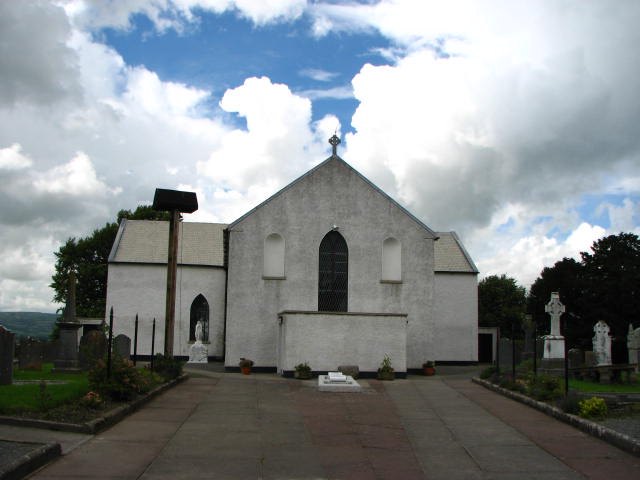
- St. Joseph's Church

- Location in Ireland
- Coordinates: 52°47′50″N 6°53′43″W
- Country: Ireland
- Province: Leinster
- County: County Carlow
- Elevation: 57 m (187 ft)

Population (2022)
  - Total: 338
- Time zone: UTC+0 (WET)
  - Summer (DST): UTC-1 (IST (WEST))
- Irish Grid Reference: S742723

Tinryland (Irish: Tigh an Réileáin, translated as "house of Raoilinn") is a village in County Carlow, Ireland, less than 5 km south of Carlow town. It is within the townland of Tinriland (historically Tinrilan), in the parish of Tullowmagimma.

== History ==
Evidence of settlement in the Neolithic Period (3700-3400 BC) was found at the ancient burial site in Linkardstown in 1943. The find consisted of a polygonal stone chamber paved with stones that sloped upwards and inwards. Inside was found the remains of a single human, along with some pottery.

Linkardstown Church and Graveyard is now in ruins, but the old stone baptismal font used in the church and which dates from the 18th century now stands in the grounds of the modern St. Joseph's Church, Tinryland.

Ballyloo Castle, only a fragment of which remains, was home to the Kavanagh family and was built by Art Óg Kavanagh of Pulmonty, King of Leinster who died in 1417. This castle was the centre for the Kavanagh's of Ballyloo until the arrival of Oliver Cromwell 200 years later.

== Notable people and diaspora ==
In nearby Clonmelsh Church Graveyard (Rath Melsigi) are buried the ancestors of Walt Disney and members of the Butler family.

Pierce Butler of Garryhundon was one of the architects of the American Constitution and was one of its signatories in Philadelphia in 1788. He went on to represent South Carolina at George Washington's Presidential Inauguration. He went on to become adviser to three consecutive presidents and turned down a nomination to run for the Vice-Presidency before his death in 1822.

A commemoration stone to the 1798 rebellion was erected on the main approach road to the village on the 200th anniversary of the uprising in 1998. The monument was built in honour of the locals who fought and died in the insurrection and at the battle of Carlow in May 1798.

== Sport ==
The local Gaelic Athletic Association (GAA) club, Tinryland GFC, fields Gaelic football teams in competitions organised by the Carlow County Board. Since the club's establishment in 1888, it has won the Carlow Senior Football Championship 15 times, seven U21 Football Championships, two Minor Football Championship, one Intermediate Football Championship, four Junior A Football Championships and one Junior B Football Championship.

The local Ladies' Gaelic football (LGFA) team, Bennekerry/Tinryland LGFA, won the All-Ireland Ladies' Intermediate Club Football Championship in 2024.
