= Tillinghast L'Hommedieu Huston =

American baseball club owner (1867–1938)

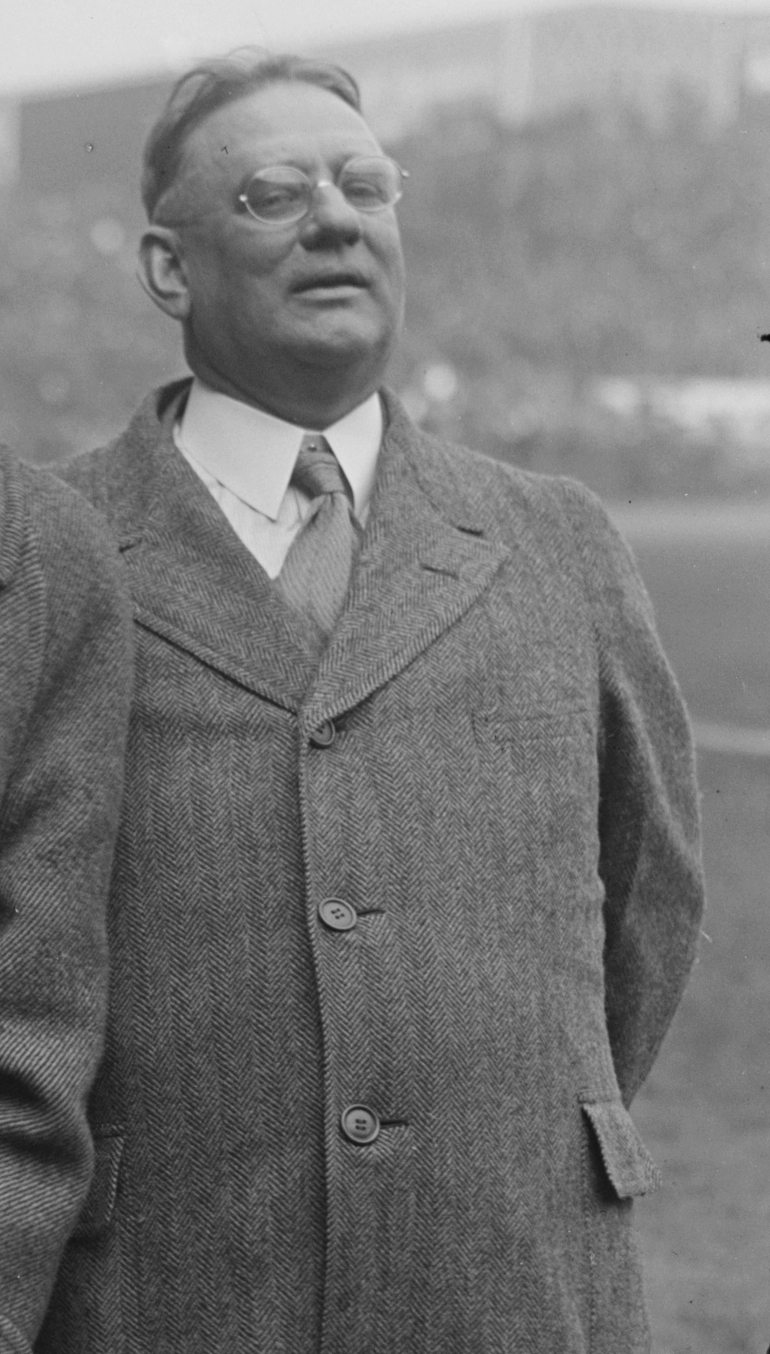
- Huston at the opening of Yankee Stadium, April 18, 1923
- Born: July 17, 1867; Buffalo, New York, US
- Died: March 29, 1938 (aged 70); Darien, Georgia, US
- Occupation: Civil engineer
- Spouse: Lena Belle Glathart
- Children: 3
- Military career
- Allegiance: United States
- Branch: United States Army
- Service years: 1898–1901, 1917–1919
- Rank: Lieutenant colonel
- Units: United States Volunteer Engineers; 16th Engineer Brigade
- Conflicts: Spanish–American War; World War I

Tillinghast L'Hommedieu Huston (July 17, 1867 – March 29, 1938) was an American civil engineer and businessman. He co-owned the New York Yankees of Major League Baseball with Jacob Ruppert from 1915 to 1923, turning them from one of the worst franchises in baseball into a World Series contender.

A civil engineer by trade, Huston worked for Cincinnati's waterworks before forming a company of volunteer engineers in the Spanish–American War. He was commissioned as a captain, earning him the nickname "Cap". He stayed in Cuba after the war as a private contractor, rebuilding infrastructure in Cuba and earning his personal fortune. Returning to the United States, Huston partnered with Ruppert to buy the Yankees in 1915. Together, they used their wealth to acquire talented players who improved the team, including Babe Ruth.

Huston returned to the military during World War I, and was promoted to major and then to lieutenant colonel. Following a dispute, Huston sold his interests in the Yankees to Ruppert in 1923. He purchased the Butler Island Plantation, which had fallen into disrepair, and rebuilt it as a dairy and lettuce farm. Huston resided at the plantation until his death in 1938.

== Early life ==
Huston was born in Buffalo, New York, on July 17, 1867, to a schoolteacher from Kentucky and a civil engineer from Ireland. He was one of seven children, and was raised in Cincinnati, Ohio, where he attended public schools. Huston's father named him after two engineers who he admired, and trained him to be an engineer. They worked together on the Louisville and Nashville Railroad, the Atchison, Topeka and Santa Fe Railway, the Chesapeake and Ohio Railway, and the Cincinnati Southern Railway. In 1890, he returned to Cincinnati and became the assistant chief engineer of the Cincinnati Waterworks, earning $135 per month ($5,225 in current dollar terms).

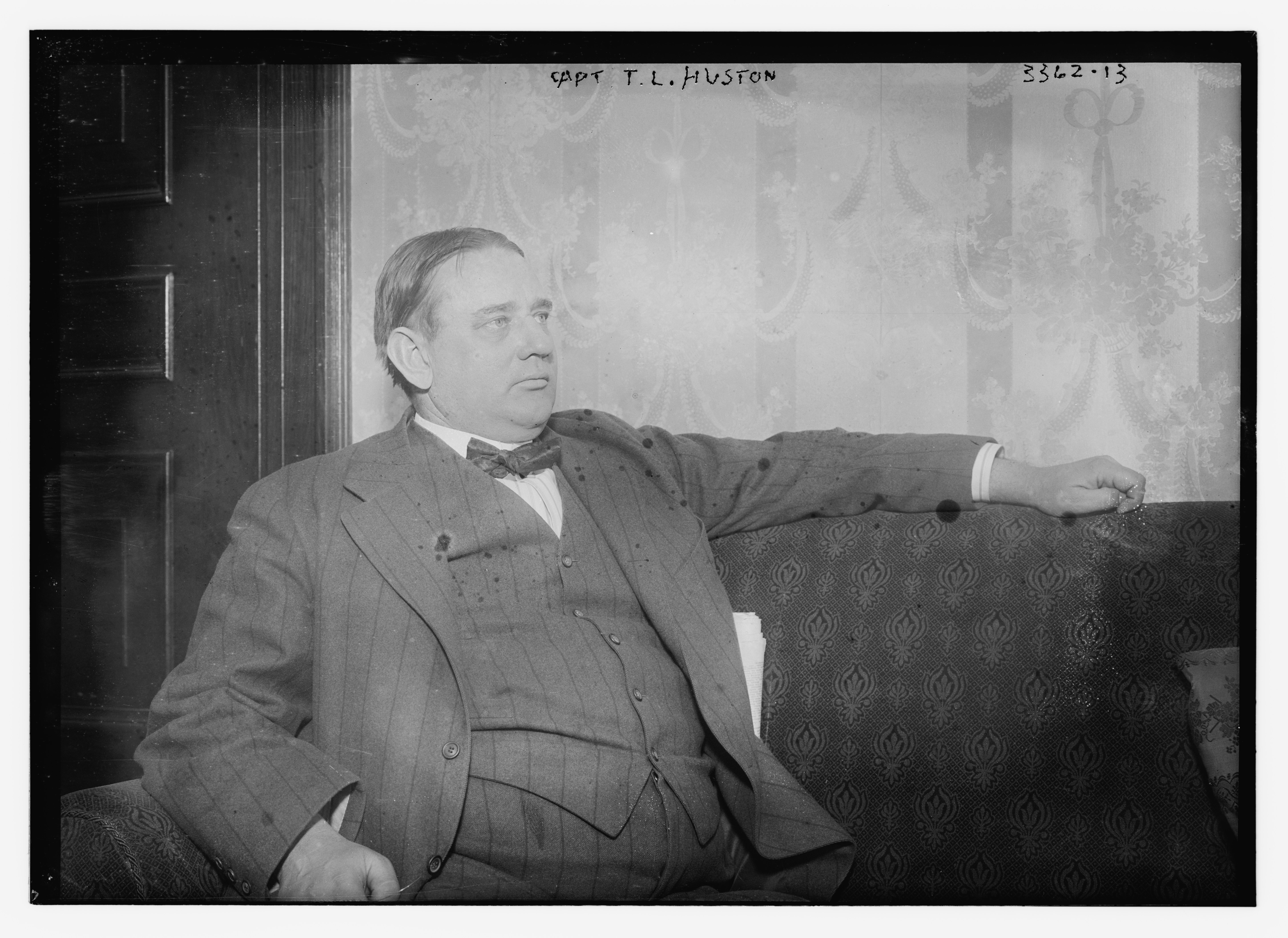
Huston in 1910

When the Spanish–American War began, Huston organized a company of engineers with expertise in waterworks and masonry for service in Cuba. His company earned the authorization of the United States Department of War, and was joined to the Second Regiment of the United States Volunteer Engineers under the command of Colonel Willard Young. Huston was commissioned as a captain, and was given charge of engineers during their training at Camp Meade. His company was integrated into the Second Army Corps and selected to go to Havana in December 1898. They took over maintenance of Havana's waterworks and also improved sanitation in leper colonies. Huston became an advisor to Leonard Wood, the military governor of Cuba.

In 1901, Huston resigned from the Army. He stayed in Havana, working as a private contractor, and made a personal fortune through government contracts. Huston worked with a company that was based in New York City, so he relocated his family there and visited frequently. He formed a partnership with Norman Davis, and they built highways, railroads, and buildings. In 1911, they were given the charge of dredging Cuban harbors, including Havana Harbor, Santiago Harbor, Cienfuegos Bay, and the Bay of Matanzas. The Congress of Cuba approved a USD$10 million contract ($345,535,714 in current dollar terms) for Huston's company, which was signed into law by José Miguel Gómez, the president of Cuba. His successor, Mario García Menocal, terminated the contract in 1913.

== New York Yankees ==
=== Bill Donovan years (1914–1917) ===
Huston was a baseball fan. He traveled back to the United States to see baseball games, and arranged for teams to visit Cuba for exhibition games. Huston became friends with John McGraw, the manager of the New York Giants of the National League, whom he met in 1911. Huston entered into a deal to buy the Chicago Cubs of the National League from Charles P. Taft in July 1914, in which McGraw would become a part-owner and manager. The deal fell through when Harry Hempstead refused to let McGraw out of his contract with the Giants. McGraw introduced Huston to Jacob Ruppert, a brewer who was also looking to purchase a baseball team. After meeting for thirty minutes at the Hotel Claridge, Huston and Ruppert entered into a partnership.

By the 1914 season, Frank J. Farrell and William Stephen Devery, the owners of the New York Yankees of the American League, were running out of money. The Yankees were not a competitive franchise on the field, and did not have their own stadium; they were tenants of the Giants at the Polo Grounds, paying $65,000 annually ($2,068,668 in current dollar terms) in rent. In December 1914, Huston and Ruppert entered into negotiations to buy the Yankees, and the deal was completed on January 30, 1915. They paid $463,000 ($14,735,280 in current dollar terms), each contributing half of the purchase price. Ruppert became team president, and Huston served as secretary and treasurer. Bill Donovan was hired to manage the team.

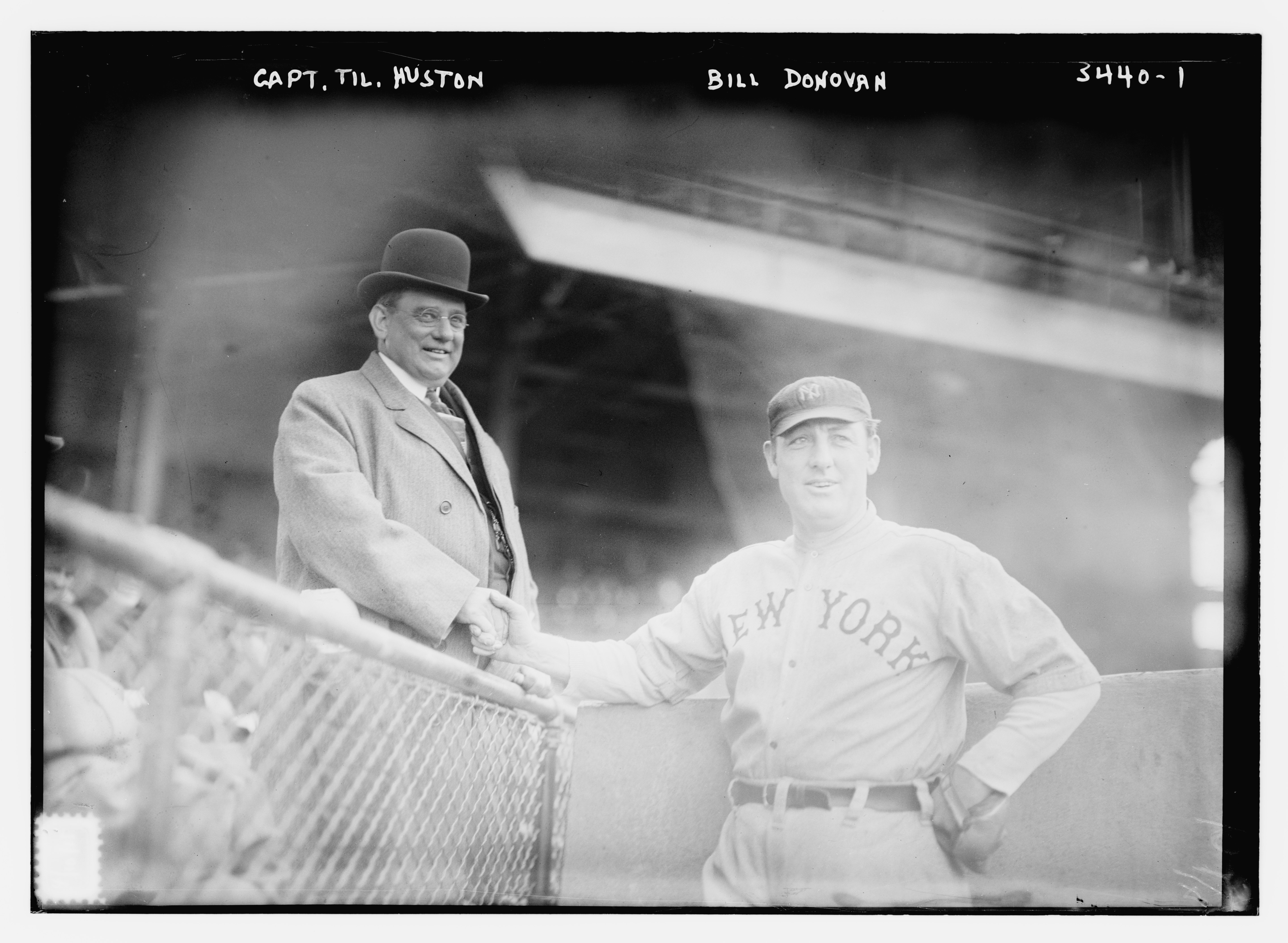
Huston (left) with Bill Donovan

To convince Huston and Ruppert to take on such a troubled franchise, Ban Johnson, the president of the American League, had gotten agreements from other teams to make decent players available to the Yankees at reasonable prices. The Yankees purchased Wally Pipp and Hugh High from the Detroit Tigers for $5,500 ($175,041 in current dollar terms), but other owners withheld their players. The Yankees attempted to acquire Shoeless Joe Jackson, but he was traded to the Chicago White Sox instead. Huston accused Johnson of directing the transaction without allowing the Yankees to bid. The Yankees finished in fifth place in the American League in 1915, and retained Donovan as their manager while releasing many players.

Huston and Ruppert used their wealth to acquire talented players, and used the collapse of the Federal League after the 1915 season as an opportunity to acquire them. Huston and Ruppert reported that they spent $120,000 ($3,819,079 in current dollar terms) on player acquisitions in their first year as owners, with the most expensive acquisitions being Home Run Baker, Bob Shawkey, Lee Magee, Dan Tipple, Nick Cullop, and Joe Gedeon. The Yankees finished in fourth place in 1916, their best finish since 1910, and they signed Donovan for another season. In 1917, Huston brought a drill sergeant to spring training to instill discipline in his players, a strategy later adopted by other team owners.

Upon American entry into World War I in April 1917, Huston reenlisted in the Army as the commander of the 16th Regiment of Engineers. His regiment sailed for Europe on August 1, 1917, and reached France in March 1918, among the first to reach the front lines. He served in France, building roads and railroads behind British lines near Bethune during the German spring offensive, and then with the American Expeditionary Forces near Varennes and Montfaucon during the Meuse–Argonne offensive. Huston was promoted to major in May 1918, and again to lieutenant colonel in September 1918. General John J. Pershing cited Huston for meritorious service.

=== Miller Huggins years (1917–1923) ===
The Yankees slumped in 1917, falling to sixth place. After the 1917 season, Ruppert dismissed Donovan and hired Miller Huggins, who was recommended to Ruppert by Johnson, and signed him to a two-year contract. Huston had wanted to hire Wilbert Robinson as the Yankees' next manager and was angered to find out that Ruppert had hired Huggins. The Yankees finished in fourth place in the 1918 season. Huston returned to the United States in January 1919, after spending 17 months overseas. He never accepted Huggins, and worked to undermine him, while also harboring anger towards Johnson for his interference in the franchise.

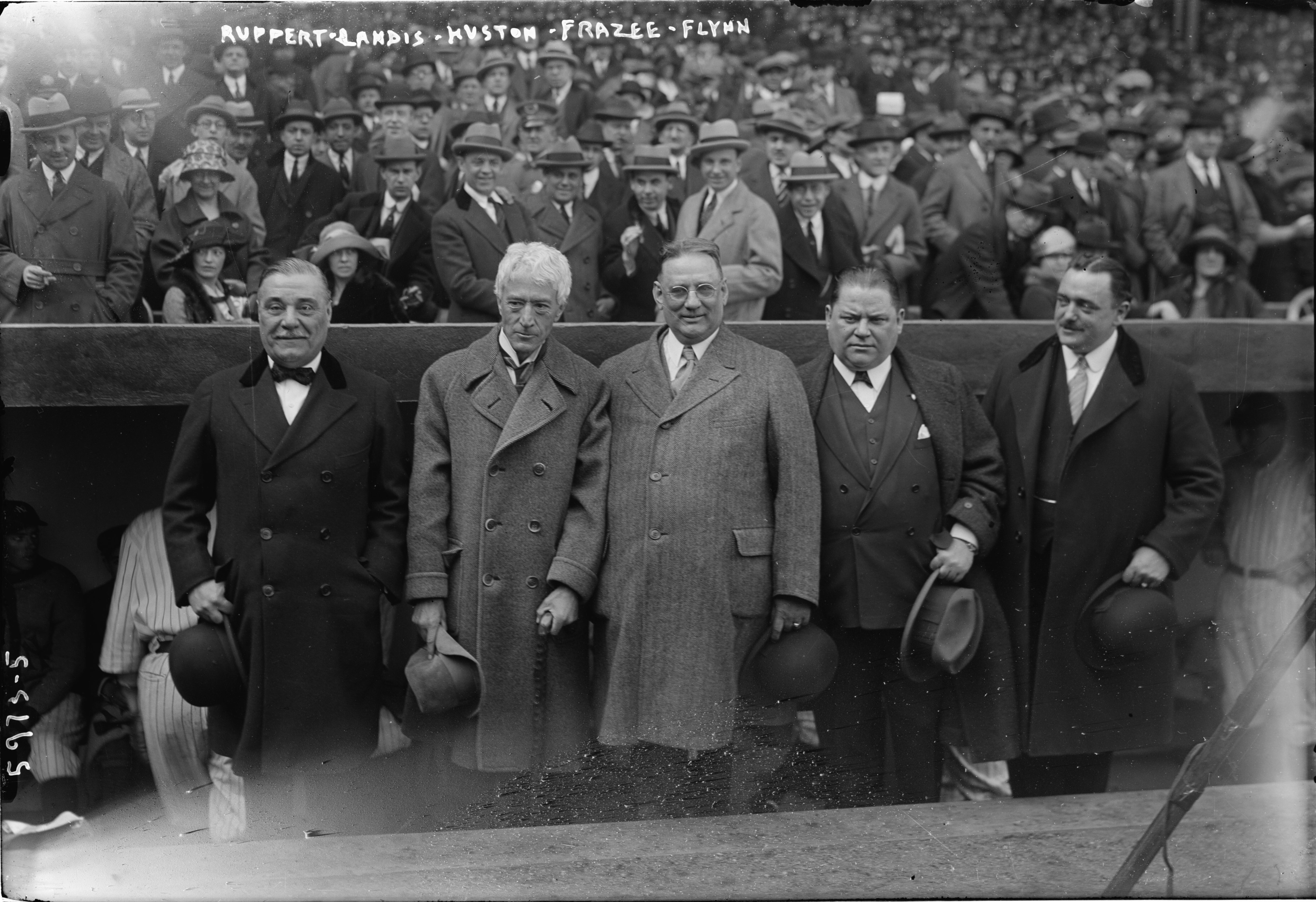
From left, Jacob Ruppert, Kenesaw Mountain Landis, Tillinghast Huston, Harry Frazee, and Edward J. Flynn at the opening of Yankee Stadium

In July 1919, Carl Mays left the Boston Red Sox without permission. Johnson demanded that the Red Sox suspend him, but instead, the Red Sox traded Mays to the Yankees. Johnson suspended Mays for deserting the Red Sox. Huston accused Johnson of having a financial interest in the Cleveland Indians, and Huston and Ruppert obtained a temporary injunction allowing Mays to play. New York Supreme Court Justice Robert F. Wagner ruled in favor of the Yankees, granting a permanent injunction. The owners of the Yankees, Red Sox, and Chicago White Sox began to collectively oppose Johnson, becoming known as the "Insurrectos". Though the Insurrectos were outnumbered by the five teams loyal to Johnson, they held three out of the four seats on the board of directors. The conflict between the Insurrectos and Johnson contributed to Kenesaw Mountain Landis's appointment as the first Commissioner of Baseball.

The Yankees finished in third place in 1919, and signed Huggins to manage for another season. In December 1919, the Yankees purchased Babe Ruth from the Red Sox for $100,000 ($1,857,006 in current dollar terms), a record sum for a player. In Ruth's first season as a Yankee, the team set a record for attendance, drawing almost 1.3 million fans during the 1920 season. They finished in third place, and retained Huggins for the 1921 season. The Yankees continued to acquire talented players from the Red Sox, as team owner Harry Frazee had financial difficulties and Johnson prevented the loyal team owners from dealing with Frazee. The players the Yankees acquired from Boston included Waite Hoyt and Wally Schang after the 1920 season, Sad Sam Jones, Bullet Joe Bush, and Everett Scott after the 1921 season, and Herb Pennock before the 1923 season.

Feeling overshadowed by the Yankees in their own stadium, the Giants announced that they would not renew the Yankees' lease at the Polo Grounds for the 1921 season, though they ultimately relented and allowed the Yankees to remain for two more seasons. Huston and Ruppert began looking for a location to build their own stadium, choosing a site adjacent to Macombs Dam Park in the Bronx in 1921. They set out to build the first three-tiered baseball stadium, with an anticipated 75,000 capacity; the Polo Grounds held fewer than 40,000. Construction began in 1922.

The Yankees finished in first place in the American League in 1921, reaching the 1921 World Series, which they lost to the Giants. Huston blamed Huggins, and wanted him fired. The Yankees again won the American League in 1922, but lost to the Giants in the 1922 World Series, and Huston again argued for firing Huggins. When Ruppert refused, Huston announced that he would sell his shares. Despite his desire to sell the team, Huston oversaw the construction of Yankee Stadium, which was completed before the start of the 1923 season. He sold his stake in the Yankees to Ruppert for $1.25 million ($23,620,605 in current dollar terms), finalizing the deal in May 1923. Ruppert gave Huston a seat on the board of directors. With Huston's sale of his share of the Yankees, and Frank Chance's hiring in Boston, relations worsened between the two franchises.

== Later life ==
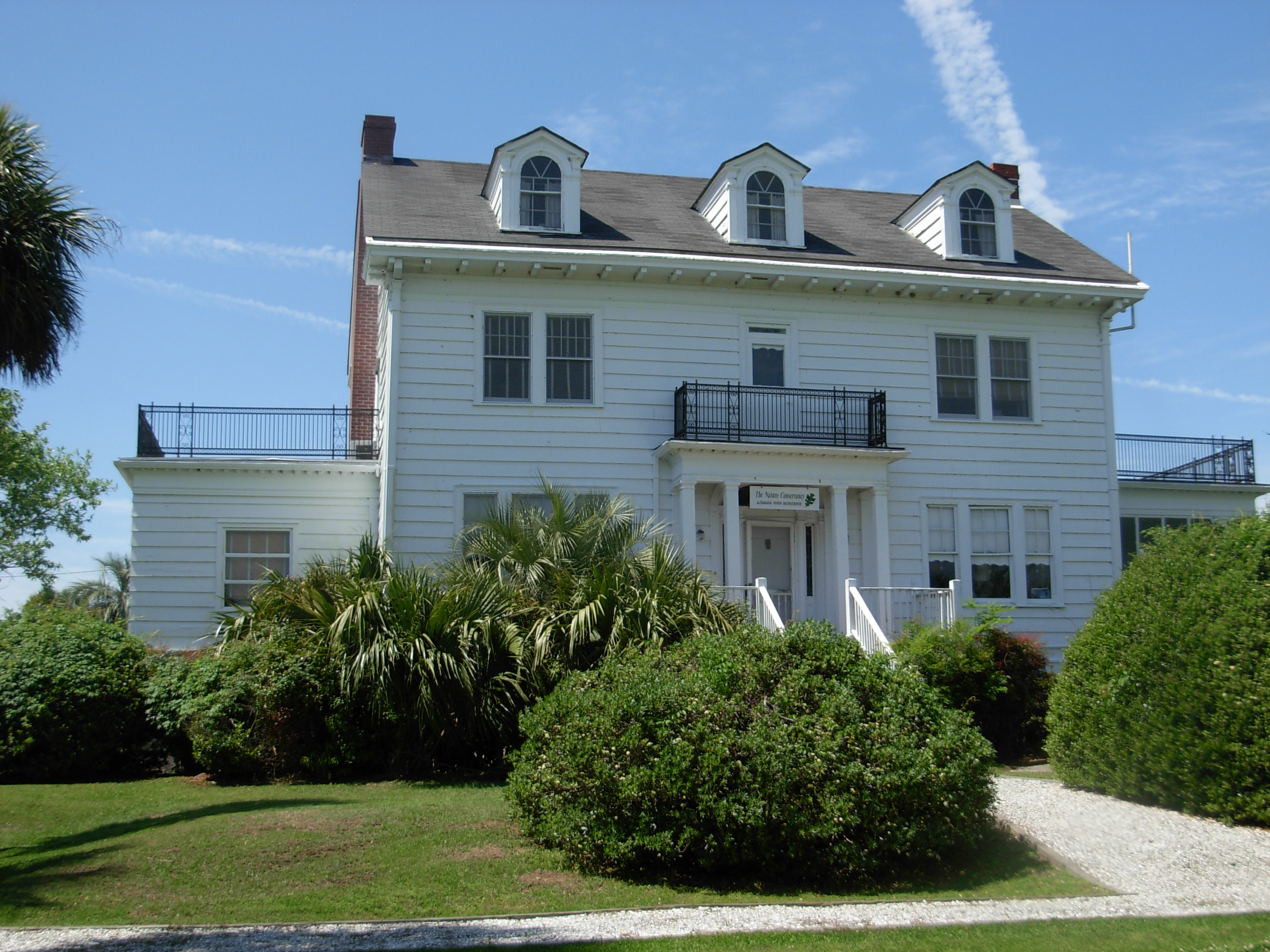
Huston House on Butler Island Plantation

After selling his stake in the Yankees, Huston purchased 650 acres (260 ha) on Champney Island, located in the Altamaha River, south of Darien, Georgia, to establish a duck preserve. The land was originally used for cultivating rice, but had been deserted after the American Civil War. When Huston learned about the history of rice cultivation on the land, he decided to restore the area. He bought the 1,250-acre (510 ha) Butler Island Plantation on Butler Island, a neighboring island, and set about recultivating the land. Huston brought in tractors, dredgers, and thousands of workers to rebuild trenches and levees and plant various species of fruits and vegetables. He built the Huston House on the property in 1927. In 1929, Huston began planting lettuce, which the plantation continued to produce after his death. Huston spent over $100,000 ($1,818,609 in current dollar terms) on a herd of Guernsey cattle to establish the plantation as a dairy farm in 1932.

Still interested in baseball, Huston served as an advisor to the Atlanta Crackers of the Southern Association during the 1933 season. He arranged for Robinson to join the team as its president. In the mid-1930s, Huston attempted to purchase the Brooklyn Dodgers of the National League, and he stated that his intention was to hire Ruth as his manager. In 1937, he acknowledged that he had offered to buy the Dodgers for $1.7 million ($38,072,917 in current dollar terms), but was turned down.

== Personal life ==
Huston served as national commander of the Veterans of Foreign Wars (VFW) and the United Spanish War Veterans in 1923. He toured the country in support of veterans' issues, such as calling for passage of the World War Adjusted Compensation Act. He remained involved in veterans' issues throughout his life. When a game in the 1922 World Series ended as a tie, the gate receipts were donated to the VFW and used to found the VFW National Home for widows and orphans of veterans. Huston served as director of the National Home later in his life. He involved himself in other civic ventures. He was a lifelong member of the Society of Civil Engineers and served as president of the chamber of commerce for Brunswick, Georgia.

Huston and his wife, Lena Belle Glathart, a native of Lawrence, Kansas, had three children. Huston died at the Butler Island Plantation on March 29, 1938, from an apparent heart attack. He was buried at Christ Church at St. Simons, Georgia, on March 31 with military honors.

== See also ==
- List of civil engineers
- List of New York Yankees owners and executives

Sporting positions
Preceded by William S. Devery and Frank J. Farrell	Owner of the New York Yankees (with Jacob Ruppert); 1915–1923	Succeeded by Jacob Ruppert
