= Journal of a Residence on a Georgian Plantation in 1838–1839 =

Nonfiction Victorian-era account of residency in Georgia, USA

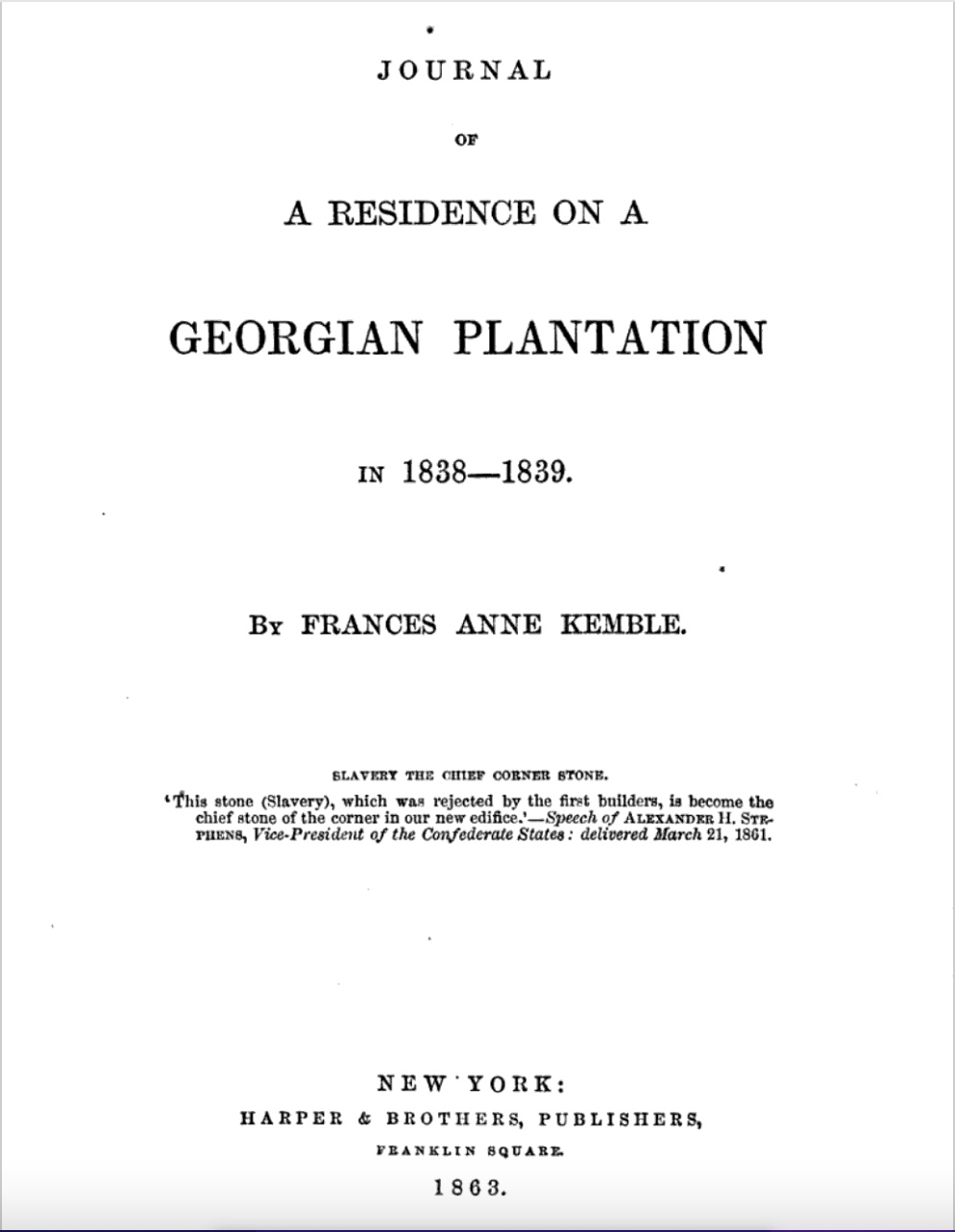
Journal of a Residence on a Georgian Plantation in 1838–1839

Journal of a Residence on a Georgian Plantation in 1838–1839 (the Journal) is an account by Fanny Kemble of the time spent on her husband's plantation in Butler Island, Georgia. The account was not published until 1863, after her marriage had ended and the American Civil War had begun. According to PBS, she decided to publish it then "in response to England's hostility toward the North and Lincoln's Emancipation Proclamation."

Kemble was already notable in her own right both before and after the publication of the Journal, but it represents her "lasting historical importance."

== Background ==
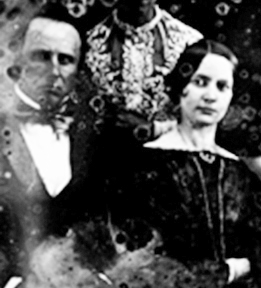
Pierce Mease Butler and Frances Kemble Butler

Frances Anne Kemble (1809-1893) was an English stage actress who met and married Pierce Mease Butler, a Philadelphian who was the absentee owner of large rice and cotton plantations on St. Simons Island and Butler Island, Georgia where hundreds of people were enslaved.

While living in Philadelphia, Kemble became familiar with the abolitionist teachings of the Quakers and began to question the source of her husband's wealth. He convinced her to visit the plantation with him and believed that would help her see the plantation system sympathetically. The family travelled to the plantation in 1838, and Kemble journaled about the living and working conditions of the enslaved people on the plantation, becoming increasingly abolitionist herself, which resulted in tensions between her and her husband.

Butler threatened to deny Kemble access to their two daughters if she published anything of her observations about the plantation conditions. The couple divorced in 1849. Butler was awarded custody of their children, and forbade Kemble from seeing them.

== Journal ==
The Journal documents Kemble's initial experiences of appreciating aspects of plantation life with the exception of "the one small thing of 'the slavery'" and her growing horror with the system. She writes about conversations with enslaved people and her attempts to intercede with her husband on behalf of the people enslaved on his plantations.

The unpublished account was read widely by abolitionists before the Civil War. Kemble had been reluctant to publish it because of ongoing tensions with her former husband, but when the Civil War started, and Britain supported the Confederacy, she decided to publish to try to change Britain's views of the Confederacy, the war, and the Emancipation Proclamation.

=== Publication history ===
The Journal was first published in England in May 1863 and soon afterward in the United States. It went out of print until 1961, when Alfred A. Knopf published a reprint with a foreword by John A. Scott.

=== Reviews ===
The Journal was reviewed contemporaneously in The New York Times and The Atlantic; the latter noted:

For never could such a book speak with such power as at this moment. The tumult of the war will be forgotten, as you read, in the profound and appalled attention enforced by this remarkable revelation of the interior life of Slavery. The spirit, the character, and the purpose of the Rebellion are here laid bare. Its inevitability is equally apparent. The book is a permanent and most valuable chapter in our history; for it is the first ample, lucid, faithful, detailed account, from the actual head-quarters of a slave-plantation in this country, of the workings of the system, — its persistent, hopeless, helpless crushing of humanity in the slave, and the more fearful moral and mental dry-rot it generates in the master.

— The Atlantic, August 1863

In 1960, the historian Margaret Davis Cate published a "scathing critique" sympathetic to the plantation system and vilified Kemble's description of it in the Georgia Historical Quarterly.

Modern critics note that Kemble was primarily arguing for improved conditions for enslaved people and that her abolitionist views were based on the belief that "moral failings" of slave owners inevitably resulted in mistreatment, rather than an enslaved person's inborn right to freedom, justified abolition.

== Impact ==
Kemble's Journal changed how Britain viewed the Confederacy and the Emancipation Proclamation and affected feelings in Britain on helping the Confederacy.

According to Encyclopedia.com Kemble's "lasting historical importance... derives from the private journal she kept during her time in the Sea Islands." According to the University of Georgia Press, which has the book in reprint, it "has long been recognized by historians as unique in the literature of American slavery."

The Journal inspired the one-woman show "Shame the Devil: An Audience with Fanny Kemble" by Ann Ludlum, which was produced in Brunswick, Georgia, in 2016. The show continues annual performances at Brunswick's Ritz Theatre as of 2022.
