= Pierce Butler (American politician) =

Founding Father of the United States (1744–1822)

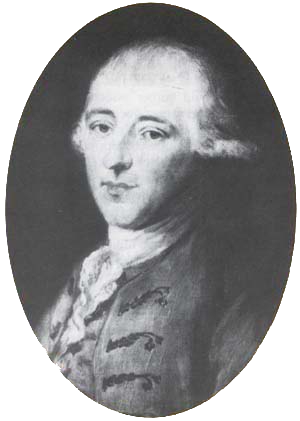

United States Senator from South Carolina
- In office March 4, 1789 – October 25, 1796
- Preceded by: Inaugural holder
- Succeeded by: John Hunter
- In office November 4, 1802 – November 21, 1804
- Preceded by: John E. Colhoun
- Succeeded by: John Gaillard

Delegate from South Carolina to the Congress of the Confederation
- In office May 25, 1787 – September 17, 1787

Personal details
- Born: July 11, 1744 Garryhundon, County Carlow, Kingdom of Ireland
- Died: February 15, 1822 (aged 77) Philadelphia, Pennsylvania, U.S.
- Resting place: Christ Episcopal Church and Churchyard, Philadelphia
- Party: Federalist, Democratic-Republican
- Spouse: Mary Middleton
- Children: 8
- Parent(s): Sir Richard Butler, 5th Baronet; Henrietta Percy
- Profession: Soldier, planter
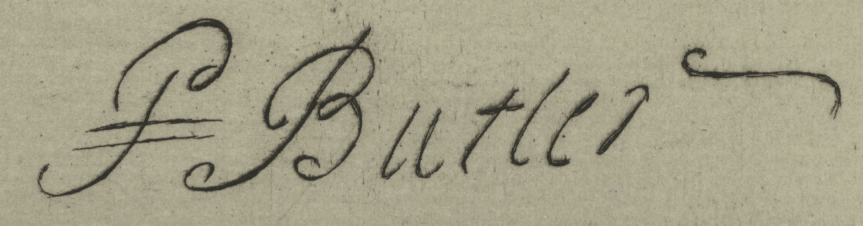
- Signature

Military service
- Allegiance: Great Britain; United States: South Carolina
- Branch/service: British Army; South Carolina militia
- Rank: Adjutant General; Major (combat rank)
- Battles/wars: American Revolutionary War; Siege of Savannah

Pierce Butler (July 11, 1744 – February 15, 1822) was an Anglo-Irish American politician who was one of the Founding Fathers of the United States. Born in the Kingdom of Ireland, Butler emigrated to the British North American colonies, where he fought in the American Revolutionary War. After the war, he served as a state legislator and was a member of the Congress of the Confederation. In 1787, he served as a delegate to the 1787 Constitutional Convention, where Butler signed the Constitution of the United States; he was also a member of the United States Senate.

As one of the largest slaveholders in the United States, he frequently defended American slavery for both political and personal motives, even though he had private misgivings about the institution and particularly about the Atlantic slave trade. He introduced the Fugitive Slave Clause into a draft of the Constitution, which gave a federal guarantee to the property rights of slaveholders. Butler also supported counting the entire slave population in state totals for Congressional apportionment. The Constitution's Three-fifths Compromise counted only three-fifths of the enslaved population in state totals but still led to white voters in Southern United States having disproportionate power in the United States Congress.

== Early life ==
Butler was born on July 11, 1744, in Garryhundon, County Carlow, Ireland. He was born into the Anglo-Irish Protestant Ascendancy. He was an Anglican until after the American Revolution when he became a member of the Episcopal Church alongside many of America's Founding Fathers. He was the third son of Sir Richard Butler, 5th Baronet, of Cloughgrenan (1699–1771), and his wife, Henrietta Percy. He resigned from a commission in the British Army in 1773 and settled with his wife, Mary, in South Carolina.

== Revolutionary war soldier ==
In early 1779, Governor John Rutledge asked Butler to help reorganize South Carolina's defenses. Butler assumed the post of the state's adjutant general, a position that carried the rank of brigadier general. He preferred to be addressed as major, his highest combat rank.

Meanwhile, the British were shifting their wartime strategy. By 1778, King George III and his ministers faced a new military situation in the Thirteen Colonies. Their forces in the northern and middle colonies had reached a stalemate with Washington's Continentals, more adequately supplied and better trained after the hard winter at Valley Forge. There was a risk that France would enter the war as a partner of the Americans. The British developed a "southern strategy." They believed that the many Loyalists in the southern states (with whom the British had an active trade through cotton, rice and tobacco) would rally to the Crown if supported by regular troops. They planned a reconquest of the rebellious colonies one at a time, moving north from Georgia. They launched their new strategy by capturing Savannah in December 1778.

Butler joined to mobilize South Carolina's militia to resist the British invasion. Later, he helped prepare the state units used in the counterattack which attempted to drive British forces from Georgia. Butler served as a volunteer aide to General Lachlan McIntosh during the operation, which climaxed with an attempted attack on Savannah. The hastily raised and poorly prepared militia troops could not compete with the well-trained British regulars, and the Patriots' effort to relieve Savannah were defeated.

In 1780, the British captured Charleston, South Carolina, and with it most of the colony's civil government and military forces. Butler escaped as part of a command group deliberately located outside the city. Over the next two years, he developed a counterstrategy to defeat the southern operations of. Refusing to surrender, allies in South Carolina and the occupied portions of Georgia and North Carolina organized guerrilla operations against the British. As adjutant general, Butler worked with former members of the militia and Continental Army veterans such as Francis Marion and Thomas Sumter to integrate the partisan efforts into a unified campaign. They united with the operations of the southern Army under the command of Horatio Gates and later Nathanael Greene.

British forces repeatedly attempted to capture Butler due to his status as a former British Army officer. Several times he barely avoided capture. Throughout the closing phases of the southern campaign, he personally donated cash and supplies to help sustain the American forces and assisted in the administration of prisoner-of-war facilities.

== Politician ==
Military operations in the final months of the Revolutionary War left Butler poor. Many of his plantations and ships were destroyed, and the international trade on which most of his income depended was in shambles. To secure loans and establish new markets, he traveled to Europe when the war ended. He enrolled his son Thomas in a London school run by Weeden Butler and engaged a new minister from among the British clergy for his Episcopal church in South Carolina.

In late 1785, Butler returned to the United States. He became an outspoken advocate of reconciliation with former Loyalists and of equal representation for the backcountry residents. Attesting to his growing political influence, the South Carolina legislature asked Butler to represent the state at the Constitutional Convention that met in Philadelphia in 1787. At the convention, he urged that the president be given the power to initiate war but did not receive a second proponent for his motion, and all the other delegates overwhelmingly rejected his proposal.

Butler's experiences as a soldier and planter-legislator led to his forceful support for a strong union of the states. At the same time, he looked to the special interests of his region. He introduced the Fugitive Slave Clause (Article 4, Section 2), which established protection for slavery in the Constitution. In addition, while privately criticizing the international trade in enslaved Africans, he supported the passage in the Constitution that prohibited regulation of the trade for 20 years. He advocated counting the entire slave population in the states' totals for Congressional apportionment but compromised to count three-fifths of the enslaved people toward that end. It ensured that the Southern planter elite exerted a strong influence in national politics for decades.

Butler displayed inconsistencies that troubled his associates. He favored ratification of the Constitution yet did not attend the South Carolina convention that ratified it. Later, he was elected by the South Carolina state legislature to three terms in the United States Senate — from 1789 to October 1796, and from November 1802 to November 1804 — but changed his party allegiance: beginning as a Federalist, he switched to the Democratic-Republicans in 1795. In 1804, he declared himself a political independent. Between his tenures as a senator, Butler ran in South Carolina's 2nd congressional district in 1798, but overwhelmingly lost to incumbent John Rutledge Jr. After these successive changes, voters did not elect Butler again to national office. They elected him three more times to the state legislature as an easterner who spoke on behalf of the west.

Vice President Aaron Burr was Butler's guest at his St. Simons plantations in September 1804. Burr was, at the time, lying low after shooting Alexander Hamilton in the July 1804 duel. The states of New York and New Jersey had each indicted Burr for murder in the duel's wake. Burr had traveled during August to Butler's plantation under the pseudonym Roswell King, Butler's overseer's name. During Burr's stay in early September, one of the worst hurricanes in history hit the area, and Burr's firsthand description documents both his stay and this event.

== Later years, post-politics ==
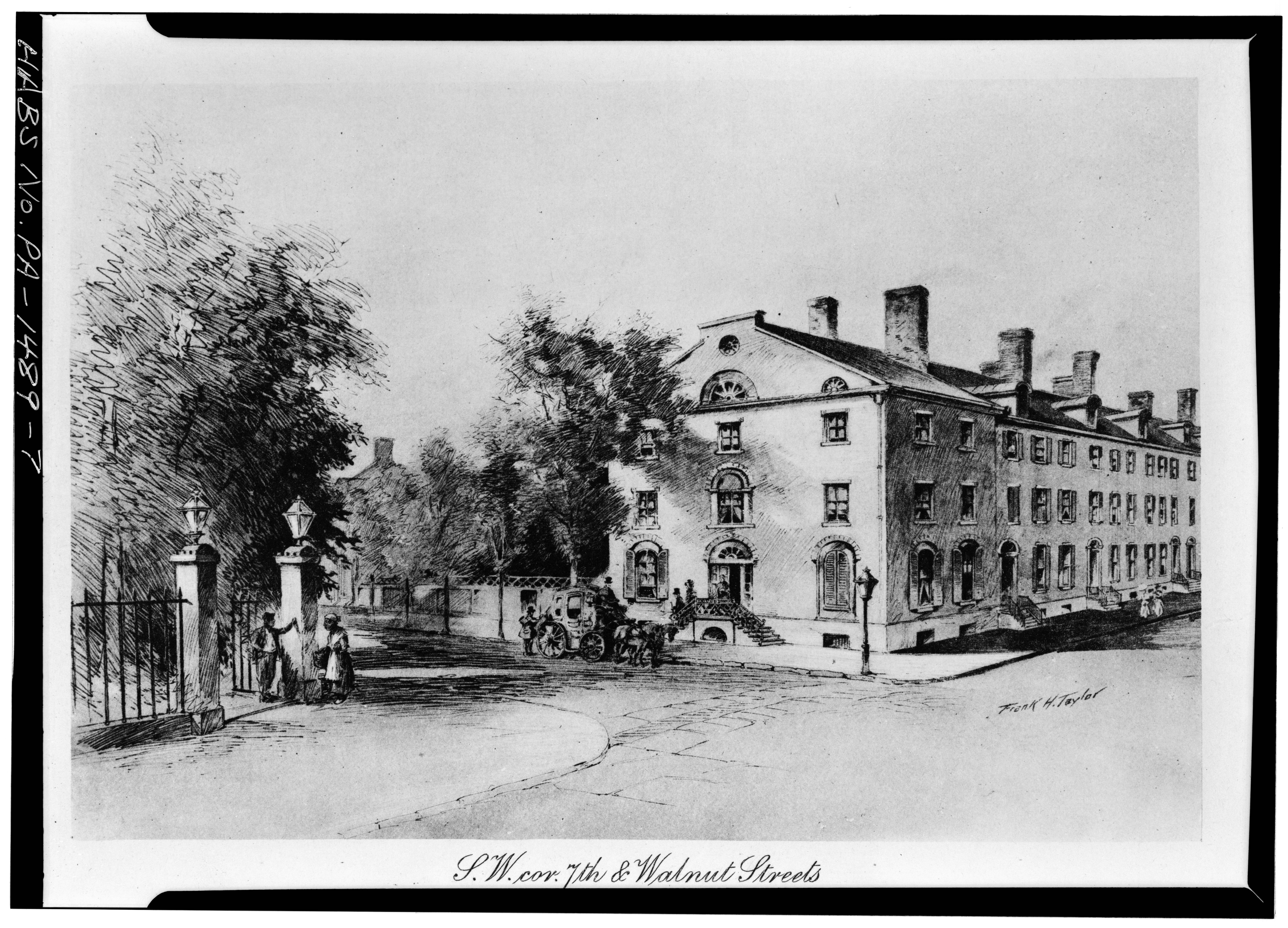
Pierce Butler House (demolished 1868), NW corner 7th & Walnut Sts., Philadelphia

Following his wife's death in 1790, Butler sold off the last of their South Carolina holdings and invested in Georgia Sea Island plantations. Butler hired Roswell King as manager of his rice plantations on St. Simon's Island and Butler Island. They had some conflicts as Butler wanted more moderate treatment of the people he enslaved than was King's style. King left in 1820 to operate a plantation near Darien. He also pursued plans in the 1830s to develop cotton mills in the Piedmont of Georgia, where he founded what became Roswell, Georgia, in 1839.

Butler retired from politics in 1805 and spent much of his time in Philadelphia. He owned a city house on Washington Square (demolished 1868), and built a suburban villa in Germantown, Butler Place (1791, demolished 1925). Through his business ventures, he became one of the wealthiest men in the nation, with substantial land holdings in several states. Like other Founding Fathers from his region, Butler also continued to support the institution of slavery. But unlike Washington or Thomas Jefferson, for example, Butler never acknowledged the fundamental inconsistency in simultaneously defending the people's freedom and supporting slavery.

Associates called Butler "eccentric" and an "enigma." He followed a path to produce the maximum liberty and respect for people he considered citizens. He wanted to maintain a strong central government but one that could never ride roughshod over the rights of the private citizen. He opposed the policies of the Federalists under Alexander Hamilton because he believed they had sacrificed the interests of westerners and had sought to force their policies on the opposition. He later split with Jefferson and the Democrats for the same reason. Butler emphasized his belief in the role of the ordinary person. Late in life, he summarized his view: "Our System is little better than [a] matter of Experiment. ... much must depend on the morals and manners of the people at large."

== Progeny and succession ==
Coat of Arms of Pierce Butler

In January 1771, Butler married Mary Middleton (c. 1750–1790). She was the orphaned daughter of Thomas Middleton, a South Carolina planter and slave importer, and was heiress to a large fortune. The couple had eight children:

- Anne Elizabeth Butler (1771–1845), unmarried
- Sarah Butler (1772–1831), married 1800, James Mease of Philadelphia
- Frances Butler (1774–1836), unmarried
- Harriot Percy Butler (1775–1815), unmarried
- Pierce Butler Jr. (1777–1780), died aged three
- Thomas Butler (1778–1838), married 1812, Eliza de Mallevault of Fort-de-France
- 3rd son, died young
- 4th son, died young

Butler disinherited his only surviving son, Thomas Butler, along with his French-born wife and children. Four of Butler's daughters reached adulthood, but only one of them, Sarah Mease, married or had children. Butler initially planned to leave his entire fortune to Sarah's eldest son, Pierce Butler Mease, but the boy died in 1810 at age 9. Butler told Sarah he would devise his estate in equal parts to her three surviving sons (including one born that year), provided they irrevocably adopt "Butler" as their surname. Two of Sarah's sons, John Mease and Pierce Butler Mease (born in 1810 and named for the brother who died), duly changed their surnames to inherit portions of the estate. Until the grandsons came of age, Butler's other surviving daughters, Frances and Anne Elizabeth ("Eliza"), had use of the most productive lands.

=== John A. Mease Butler ===
John A. Mease Butler (1806–1847) inherited half of his grandfather's plantations after adopting "Butler" as his surname in 1831. He married Gabriella Morris, but they had no children. He served in the Mexican–American War, attaining the rank of captain, but died of dysentery in camp. He was survived by his wife, who continued to reside on his estates and experienced the effects of the American Civil War. U.S. forces occupied all the Butler plantations beginning in February 1862. The January 1, 1863, Emancipation Proclamation freed all of Gabriella Morris Butler's nearly 500 enslaved people. She died later that year.

=== Pierce Mease Butler ===
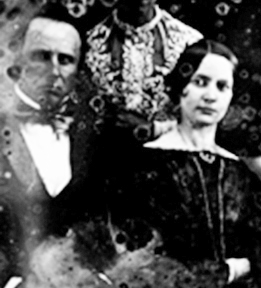
Pierce Mease Butler and Frances Butler

Pierce Mease Butler (1810–1867) inherited the other half of his grandfather's Butler Island and St. Simons Island plantations after adopting "Butler" as his surname. The English actress Fanny Kemble and her noted actor/manager father, Charles Kemble, made a two-year theatrical tour of the United States in 1832–34. Pierce Mease Butler met her during the tour and married her on June 7, 1834. They lived in Philadelphia and had two daughters, Sarah and Frances. His wife kept a journal of their brief stay on one of their plantations. She expressed extreme horror at the state of life of enslaved people and deconstructed contemporary arguments attempting to justify slavery.

Pierce Mease Butler took his family to Georgia for the winter of 1838–39. Kemble was shocked at the enslaved people's living and working conditions and complained to him about their overwork and the manager Roswell King Jr.'s treatment of them. She noted that King was known to have sired several mixed-race children with enslaved women, whom he sometimes took away from their husbands for periods. Kemble's firsthand experiences of the winter residence contributed to her growing abolitionism. The couple had increasing tensions over this and their basic incompatibility. Butler threatened to deny Kemble access to their daughters if she published anything of her observations about the plantation conditions. When they divorced in 1849, he retained custody of their daughters.

Kemble waited until 1863, after the start of the American Civil War and her daughters had come of age, to publish Journal of a Residence on a Georgian Plantation in 1838–1839. Her eyewitness indictment of slavery included an account of King's mixed-race children with slave women. The book was published in both the U.S. and England.

In the social and economic disruption of the postwar years, Pierce Mease Butler was unsuccessful in adapting to the free labor market. Amid a general agricultural depression, he failed to profit from the Sea Island plantations.

==== Slave auction ====
By mid-century, Pierce Mease Butler was among the richest men in the United States, but he squandered a fortune estimated at $700,000. He was saved from bankruptcy by the sale of his Philadelphia house and then the sale of 436 Georgia slaves on March 2–3, 1859, at Ten Broeck Racetrack, outside Savannah, Georgia. It was the largest single slave auction in U.S. history and netted him more than $300,000 (equivalent to $10,750,000 in 2025). The auction was a notable event and covered by national newspapers. He sat out the Civil War in Philadelphia, a refuge for numerous Southerners, and was imprisoned for treason in August–September 1861.

=== Later generations ===
After Pierce Mease Butler's death, his younger daughter Frances Butler Leigh and her husband, James Leigh, a minister, tried to restore productivity and operate the combined plantations but were unsuccessful in generating a profit. They left Georgia in 1877 and moved permanently to England, where Leigh had been born. Frances Butler Leigh defended her father's actions as a slaveholder in her book, Ten Years on a Georgian Plantation since the War (1883), intended as a rebuttal to her mother's critique of slavery from 20 years before.

Pierce Mease Butler's elder daughter Sarah Butler Wister married a wealthy Philadelphia doctor, Owen Jones Wister, and they lived in the Germantown section of the city. Their son, Owen Wister, became a popular American novelist, best known for The Virginian, a 1902 western novel now considered a classic. The younger Owen Wister was the last of Major Butler's descendants to inherit the plantations. He wrote about the post-Civil War South in his 1906 novel, Lady Baltimore, which romanticized "the lost aristocrats of antebellum Charleston." Wister's friend and former Harvard classmate, President Theodore Roosevelt, wrote to him criticizing the novel for making "nearly all the devils Northerners and the angels Southerners."

== Legacy ==
Pierce Butler and many of his descendants are buried in a vault in the cemetery of Christ Church, Philadelphia, built in 1727–1744 and a National Historic Landmark.

Butler Street in Madison, Wisconsin, is named in his honor.

== See also ==
- Butler Island Plantation
- Lynx Incident
- List of United States senators born outside the United States

== References and external links ==
=== Sources ===
- Malcolm Bell Jr., Major Butler's Legacy: Five Generations of a Slaveholding Family (University of Georgia Press, 1987)
- United States Congress. "Pierce Butler (id: B001186)". Biographical Directory of the United States Congress.
- James H. Hutson, "Pierce Butler's Records of the Federal Constitutional Convention," Quarterly Journal of the Library of Congress 37 (1980): 64–73.
- The Letters of Pierce Butler, 1790–1794: Nation Building and Enterprise in the New American Republic. Edited by Terry W. Lipscomb (University of South Carolina Press, 2007).
- "Pierce Butler," in Documentary History of the First Federal Congress of the United States of America. Edited by Linda Grant DePauw et al. (Johns Hopkins University Press, 1972) 14: 824–30.
- John T. White, "Pierce Butler", The National Cyclopaedia of American Biography, Vol. 2, 1895, p. 162

U.S. Senate
Preceded by Inaugural holder	U.S. senator (Class 2) from South Carolina; 1789–1796; Served alongside: Ralph Izard, Jacob Read	Succeeded by John Hunter
Preceded by John E. Colhoun	U.S. senator (Class 3) from South Carolina; 1802–1804; Served alongside: Thomas Sumter	Succeeded by John Gaillard
