= Judy Onofrio =

American artist (born 1939)

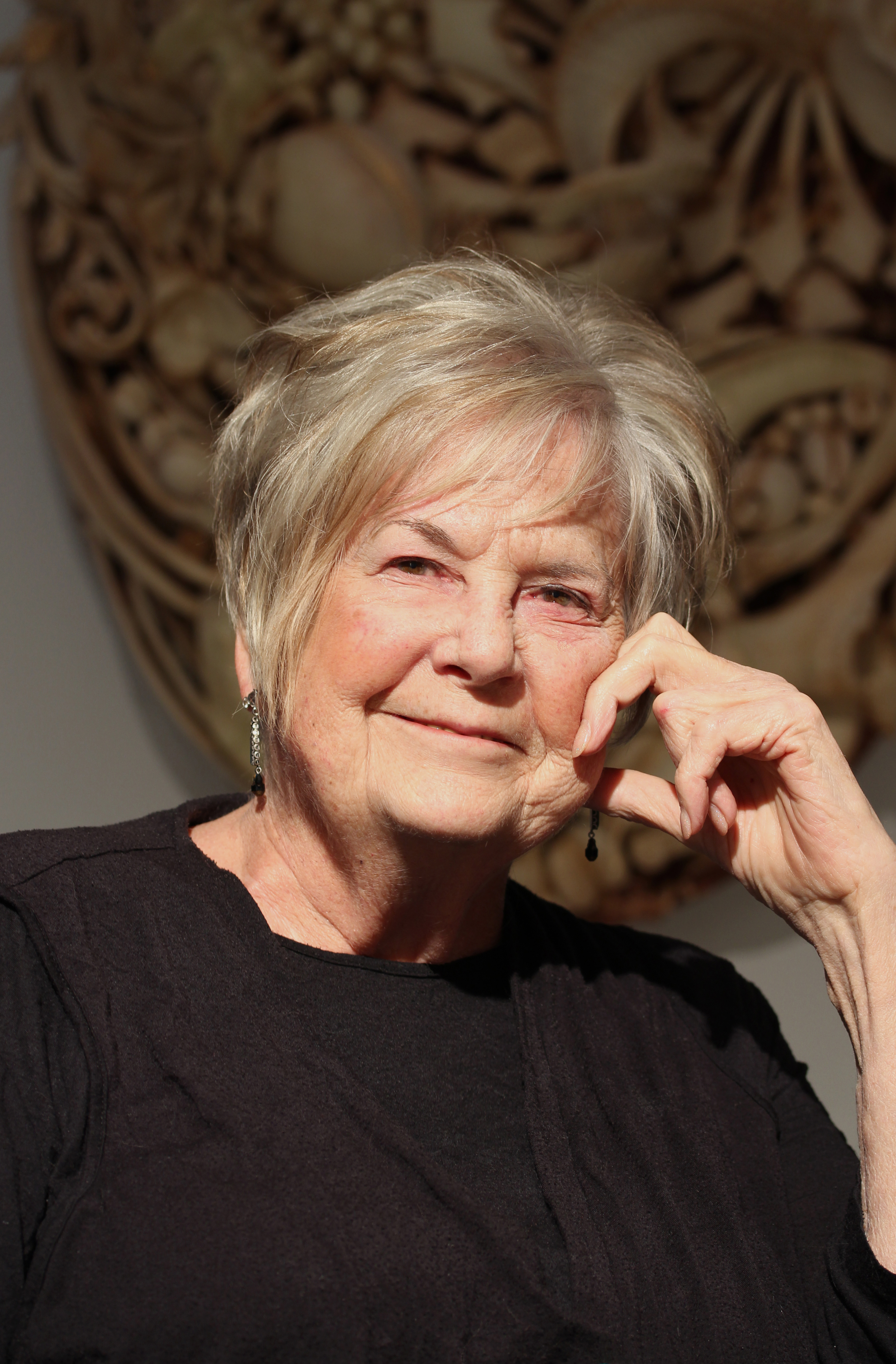
- Onofrio in her studio
- Born: November 21, 1939 (age 86); New London, Connecticut, U.S.
- Education: Sullins College, Bristol, Virginia
- Known for: Sculpture
- Website: www.judyonofrio.com

Judy Onofrio (born November 21, 1939) is an American artist who lives and works in Rochester, Minnesota, United States.

== Career ==
Born in New London, Connecticut, Onofrio studied business law and economics at Sullins College in Bristol, Virginia. She moved to Minnesota in 1967, where she became involved with the arts community in Rochester. In 1970, she became acting director of the Rochester Art Center where she founded the children's art program Total Arts Day Camp.

Involved in many other facets of the Minnesota art community, Onofrio also helped found and acted as president of the Minnesota Crafts Council in 1972, and served on the founding committee of the Minnesota Artists Exhibition Program at the Minneapolis Institute of Art in 1975.

=== The Total Arts Day Camp ===
Started from Rochester Art Center as an educational program for children, The total Arts Day Camp was a model even for art education around country. Judy's work with children, coupled with her gift for friendship, changed the nature of the Onofrio Home. In their formative years, it was not uncommon for the three Onofrio children to consider artists like Don Reitz, Warren Mackenzie, Curt Hoard, Walter Nottingham, Carole Fisher, and Jim Tanner as member of the family.

== Evolution of work ==
Judy began clay work in early 1970s, which was the time for artist including craft movement and the women's movement in US and, Artists contented that not only art could be made from any material also, real art is found everywhere: among those classified as outsiders, the insane, the unschooled, the craft makers. Interested in art, especially clay, Judy learned from every artist whose work interested her even though self-taught. Throughout 1970s, Judy joined in male-dominated Upper Midwest world of clay often as the only woman, which this movement affected her early works.

Known for glittery objects and installations, Onofrio began her artistic work in clay, working out of a clay studio in the basement of her family home. She was strongly influenced by outdoor art and built armatures on which to layer the collections of miscellaneous beads, glass, and hardware. This work was somewhat autobiographic, but humorously so.

By the early 1980s, Onofrio was creating outdoor installations, influenced in part by regional Midwestern attractions such as the Dickeyville Grotto in Wisconsin and Grotto of the Redemption in Iowa. These large-scale outdoor installations led to events such as "fire performances" in at Drake University in Des Moines, Iowa in 1984 and Grand Forks, North Dakota in 1985, pieces in which wood-and-paper pyramids laced with gunpowder were set alight. Onofrio's first major exhibition, Judyland, opened at the Minneapolis Institute of Art in 1993.

She has also worked with wood and in jewelry. Beginning in the late 2000s, her work became less colorful, with a focus on dried bone sculptures. She had a health issue with a cancer at this time, and her interests turned to matters of life and death. Stacking bone series can be a basket, vessel, or wall-mounted object. According to Tanya Hartman, "Onofrio's work has always celebrated Eros and Thanatos, the linked energies of living and dying. She has done this through colorful compilations of found detritus with sculpted clay objects." Judy describes the bone work as a whole idea of life and death for the soul vessel. Bones imply not only death but another continuous and unceasing life cycle.

In 2010, her work was exhibited in a collaboration at St. Olaf College with her daughter, photographer Jennifer Onofrio Fornes.

=== Judy Land ===
Judy Land was related to Judy house where she collected mundane objects from various place and friends. It also indicates her exhibition title Judy Land, North Dakota Museum of Art, 1993, stemmed from her house. She recalled her Button collection one day. “Buttons- I have barrels full in the garage. There are tins full of selected colors and trunks full of collections other women have put together. I have a special area for my favorite buttons where I can select choice ones to use in my brooches, i.e., Bakelite and black jet, shells and stencils, fruits and vegetables, eyeballs and cats’ eyes. I have a wonderful collection of buttons on their original cards from the factory. I belong to the button society and have some button trading friends”.

== Inspiration ==
Judy's early background of living near the East Coast beach, and collecting and finding some objects from nature attributes her prominent work

After accepting clay as the media, she started out in ceramics learning to hand building the abstract expressionist sculpture of the time. The most influenced artist is not Peter Voulkos but Robert Arneson. Judy was obsessed with playfulness and irreverence rooted in Pop art. However, she went into making objects and by the end of eighties was building wall-mounted, clay body parts that implied at the childhood fascination with physical abnormalities. Also accepting multi mediums, she in this time period, late 1980s, described where she was at or what she encountered – the way a house is blown apart by a tornado.

By describing and accumulating objects made out of clay around her, Judy appropriated colorful, playful, humorous depiction of imageries to articulate status between male and female, death and life and human condition adorned with mixed media: Ceramics, Buttons, beads, wood and paper. In late 2000s, she extended her work with animal bones after experiencing a cancer illness by celebrating the life.

== Awards ==
- 1978 - Minnesota State Arts Board Fellowship
- 1991 - Arts Midwest/NEA Regional Fellowship Grant
- 1992 - Minnesota State Arts Board Career Opportunity Grant
- 1995 - McKnight Foundation Fellowship
- 1999 - Bush Artists Fellowship
- 2000 - Rochester Art Center Lifetime Achievement Award
- 2001 - Minnesota Crafts Council Lifetime Achievement Award
- 2005 - McKnight Foundation Distinguished Artist Award
- 2018 - A.P. Anderson Award
- 2020 - Women's Caucus For Art Lifetime Achievement Award

== Major solo exhibitions ==
- Chazen Museum of Art, Madison, Wisconsin
- Rochester Art Center, Rochester, Minnesota
- Arkansas Museum of Fine Arts, Little Rock, Arkansas
- Thomas Barry Fine Arts, Minneapolis, Minnesota
- North Dakota Museum of Art, Grand Forks, North Dakota
- Daum Museum of Contemporary Art, Sedalia, Missouri
- Weisman Art Museum, University of Minnesota
- Minneapolis Institute of Art, Minneapolis, Minnesota
- Laumeier Sculpture Park, St. Louis, Missouri
- Sherry Leedy Contemporary Art, Kansas City, Missouri
- National Gallery of Victoria, Melbourne
- Plains Art Museum, Fargo, North Dakota
