= Drexciya (disambiguation) =

Drexciya may refer to:

- Drexciya, an American electronic music duo
- Drexciya (2010 film), a 2010 Ghanaian short film
- Drexciya (2012 film), a 2012 German-Burkinabe short film
