= Akosua Adoma Owusu =

Ghanaian-American filmmaker and producer (born 1984)

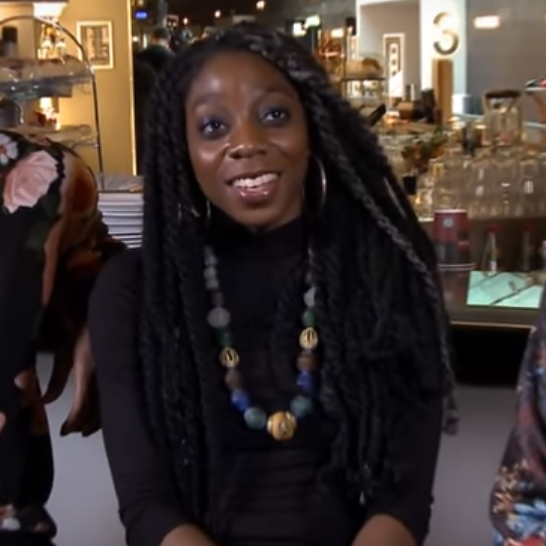
- Akosua Adoma Owusu in 2016
- Born: January 1, 1984 (age 42); Alexandria, Virginia
- Education: University of Virginia and California Institute of the Arts
- Notable work: Kwaku Ananse (film), Me Broni Ba (2009) and Drexciya (film) (2011)
- Style: Filmmaker, Producer
- Movement: Feminism
- Awards: 2015 Guggenheim Fellowship; 2013 MacDowell Colony Fellow; 2013 Africa Movie Academy Award; 2012 Art Matters grantee; 2012 Creative Capital grantee; 2011 Focus Features Africa First awardee
- Website: http://akosuaadoma.com/home.html

Akosua Adoma Owusu (born January 1, 1984) is a Ghanaian-American filmmaker and producer. Her films explore the colliding identities of black immigrants in America through multiple forms ranging from cinematic essays to experimental narratives to reconstructed Black popular media. Interpreting the notion of "double consciousness," coined by sociologist and civil rights activist W. E. B. Du Bois, Owusu aims to create a third cinematic space or consciousness. In her work, feminism, queerness, and African identities interact in African, white American, and black American cultural spaces.

She is currently a Visiting Lecturer at Harvard University and the Pratt Institute in Brooklyn, New York.

== Early life and education ==
Owusu was born to Ghanaian parents and raised in an immigrant community in Alexandria, Virginia. She is the youngest of three siblings to Grace and Albert A. Owusu, Sr. Owusu holds master's degrees in the School of Film/Video and School of Fine Art from California Institute of the Arts, which she earned in 2008. She graduated with a Bachelors interdisciplinary degree in Media Studies and Studio Art with distinction from the University of Virginia in 2005. Owusu began her career as a post-production assistant on Chris Rock's HBO documentary "Good Hair" (2009). Soon thereafter, she transitioned to making her own short, experimental films.

== Career ==
Shortly after graduating from CalArts in 2008, Owusu was a featured artist of the 56th Robert Flaherty Film Seminar programmed by renowned critic and film curator Dennis Lim. Named by Indiewire as one of the six Avant-Garde Female Filmmakers Who Redefined Cinema, and one of The Huffington Post's Black Artists: 30 Contemporary Art Makers Under 40 You Should Know, Owusu was a 2013 MacDowell Colony Fellow and a 2015 Guggenheim Fellow.

In 2020, Owusu received the Lincoln Center Award for Emerging Artists bestowed by Film at Lincoln Center.

Indiewire describes Owusu's shape-shifting film style:

Trafficking in the "complex contradictions" of blackness, displacement and memory, Owusu seamlessly transitions between experimental cinema, fine art and African tradition in order to create avant-garde films that question the nature of identity.

Her "warring consciousness" as she describes it, becomes the point of departure for her film Me broni ba (my white baby). Using hair as a medium of culture, she examines African and African-American identities and ideologies in an effort to resolve their differences. Ed Halter, one of the founders of Light Industry in Brooklyn, listed Me Broni Ba as one of 2010's top ten films in Artforum magazine.

She has produced award-winning films including Reluctantly Queer (2016) and Kwaku Ananse. In 2013, Kwaku Ananse received a Golden Bear nomination at the Berlinale and won the 2013 Africa Movie Academy Award for the West African nation of Ghana in the Best Short Film category. The film, which starred Ghanaian artist Jojo Abot, was supported by Focus Features' Africa First, and had its North American debut at the 2013 Toronto International Film Festival. Kwaku Ananse was also included in the 2013 Académie des Arts et Techniques du Cinéma - César Golden Nights, a program organized with support from UNESCO that selects notable short films.

Reluctantly Queer (2016) produced in collaboration with Dr. Kwame Edwin Otu, an assistant professor of African American and African Studies at the University of Virginia was nominated for the Golden Bear and Teddy Award at the 2016 Berlin International Film Festival. It had its North American premiere as part of the New Directors/New Films Festival.

In 2017, Owusu wrote and directed "On Monday of Last Week", a film adaptation of a short story of the same name from celebrated author Chimamanda Ngozi Adichie's short story collection, "The Thing Around Your Neck." The film which featured American actress Karyn Parsons best known for her role as Hilary Banks on the NBC sitcom The Fresh Prince of Bel-Air, secured a nomination at the 2017 African Movie Academy Awards. The film went on to screen at the Fowler Museum, ICA London and the 25th New York African Film Festival co-presented by Film at Lincoln Center.

Owusu said in a 2015 interview with South Africa's Elle (magazine), Owusu said "I began filming in Ghana as a way to find a place in my Ghanaian heritage. I often refer to myself as a Ghanaian-American, but I do consider myself to be an American filmmaker of Ghanaian descent. When I am in America, I feel very Ghanaian and when I'm in Ghana, I feel more American. I started traveling to Ghana with my friends from America to help me with the trauma of dealing with blackness both in Africa and in the African diaspora. My love for Africa was informed by romantic ideas about the continent as a home awaiting my arrival. Filming in Ghana, forms part of this journey."

In 2014, Akosua Adoma Owusu was one of the Executive Producers for Afronauts a science fiction short film written and directed by young Ghanaian filmmaker Nuotama Bodomo.

In 2013, Owusu was nominated for Tribeca Film Institute's Heineken Affinity Award's $20,000 prize.

In 2013, Owusu's film Split Ends, I Feel Wonderful (2012) received the Tom Berman Award for Most Promising Filmmaker at the 51st Ann Arbor Film Festival in Michigan.

In 2011, Owusu participated as a member of the international jury at the Festival des trois continents in Nantes, France.

In 2011, Owusu exhibited work in Cusp: Works on Film & Video by Kevin Jerome Everson & Akosua Adoma Owusu at the Luggage Store Gallery. Called the "intimate and the ideal realization of the vision of a valuable genius", this show included Revealing Roots, a silent re-enactment of one of the most dramatic scenes from Alex Haley's Roots (1977 miniseries) combining found footage and scenes that star Owusu and other African actors.

An anthology of Owusu's work has been granted to Grasshopper Film LLC.

She is represented by Farber Law LLC.

Her films are produced under her production company Obibini Pictures LLC.

== Permanent collections ==
Her work is included in the permanent collections of the Whitney Museum of American Art, the Centre Georges Pompidou, and the Fowler Museum at UCLA.

== Rex Cinema ==
In 2013, Owusu launched a global Kickstarter initiative to 'Save the Rex'! The Rex Cinema is one of Ghana's oldest cinema houses. During a time of political insecurity in Ghana in the 60s, 70s and 80s, there was a decline in the Arts. All of the cinema houses closed down in the wake of military coups and curfews. Owusu sought to save Rex Cinema for the purpose of preserving cinema houses. In 2016, Owusu developed a screenplay based on her global campaign to Save the Rex Cinema in Ghana at the Camargo Foundation in Cassis, France. In 2017, The Guardian announced that Owusu was working on a part-real life, part-fictionalized feature film about her campaign to restore the historic Rex cinema.

== International accomplishments ==
In 2015, Two films directed and produced by Owusu were critics' picks in Artforum magazine.

Owusu's film Reluctantly Queer was one of critics' best films of 2016 in Sight & Sound, a monthly film magazine published by the British Film Institute (BFI)

In 2016, Owusu was named by Britain's Royal African Society as their Human of the Week and by South Africa's Elle (magazine) as one of 50 incredible women.

In 2017, she was named in Dazed magazine as one of ten experimental filmmakers tackling the world's big topics.

In 2018, Owusu was commissioned by the Cobo Center to produce a video installation along Jefferson and Washington avenues in downtown Detroit, Michigan during Black History Month.

Owusu was awarded an artist-in-residence by the Goethe-Institut Vila Sul in Salvador, Bahia Brazil, in 2018, along with celebrated British installation artist and filmmaker Isaac Julien.

Owusu participated as a distinguished juror at the 57th annual Ann Arbor Film Festival and presented a special program dedicated to her body of work.

In 2019, she led a workshop for filmmakers, critics and researchers on Triple Consciousness at Cinema Camp an annual four-day long summer event organized by Meno Avilys Film Center based in Vilnius, Lithuania.

Owusu's film White Afro received the Premio Medien Patent Verwaltung AG prize in Pardi di domani (Leopards of Tomorrow) section of the 2019 Locarno Festival in Switzerland. The film was subtitled in three central European languages.

Owusu's film Pelourinho: They Don't Really Care About Us was one of critics' best films of 2019 in Sight & Sound magazine published by the British Film Institute (BFI).

== Selected exhibitions ==
- 2020: Akosua Adoma Owusu: Welcome to the Jungle at the Museum of Modern Art Documentary Fortnight
- 2019: Akosua Adoma Owusu: Welcome to the Jungle at Contemporary Arts Center (New Orleans)
- 2019: Akosua Adoma Owusu: Welcome to the Jungle at Wattis Institute for Contemporary Arts
- 2019: Between Three Worlds: Films by Akosua Adoma Owusu at REDCAT
- 2019: Triple Consciousness: Films by Akosua Adoma Owusu at the Yerba Buena Center for the Arts
- 2019: Sala de Video: Akosua Adoma Owusu at the São Paulo Museum of Art
- 2019: Triple Consciousness: Films by Akosua Adoma Owusu at the Institute for Contemporary Art, Richmond
- 2019: Screening: Akosua Adoma Owusu at the Museum of Contemporary Art, Chicago
- 2018: Triple Consciousness at BOZAR, Centre for Fine Arts, Brussels;
- 2018: African Twilight at the Bowers Museum;
- 2018: Fragments of a Dream at the McNay Art Museum;
- 2018: Screening and Conversation with Director Akosua Adoma Owusu at the Fowler Museum at UCLA;
- 2017: Akosua Adoma Owusu and Bus Nut at the Atlanta Contemporary Art Center;
- 2016: Making Africa: Akosua Adoma Owusu at Centre de Cultura Contemporània de Barcelona
- 2016: Films by Akosua Adoma Owusu at Tabakalera
- 2016: Encuentro con Akosua Adoma Owusu at the Museo de Arte Contemporáneo de Castilla y León
- 2016: L'évènement Akosua Adoma Owusu at the Centre Georges Pompidou
- 2016: Triple Consciousness at the Museum of Fine Arts, Houston
- 2016: Dreamlands: Immersive Cinema and Art, 1905–2016 at the Whitney Museum of American Art
- 2015: Modern Mondays: An Evening with Akosua Adoma Owusu at the Museum of Modern Art
- 2015: Existential Crisis at the Rochester Art Center
- 2015: America Is Hard to See at the Whitney Museum of American Art
- 2015: The Art of Hair in Africa at the Fowler Museum at UCLA
- 2015: Two Films by Akosua Adoma Owusu at Art and Practice in association with the Hammer Museum
- 2015: Do/Tell at the Institute of Contemporary Art, Philadelphia
- 2014: Prospect.3: Notes for Now New Orleans Triennial
- 2013: Films by Akosua Adoma Owusu at the Moderna Museet
- 2012: Fore at the Studio Museum in Harlem
- 2012: The Bearden Project at the Studio Museum in Harlem
- 2011: VideoStudio: Changing Same at the Studio Museum in Harlem
- 2011: Quadruple Consciousness at the Vox Populi (art gallery)
- 2009: 30 Seconds Off an Inch at the Studio Museum in Harlem
- 2009: Me Broni Ba at the Museum of Modern Art Documentary Fortnight

== Awards and nominations ==
Year	Award	Work	Category	Result	Ref.
2005	Virginia Film Festival	Ajube Kete	Ken Jacobs Award for Best Experimental Short Film	Won	
2008	Berlin International Film Festival	Me Broni Ba/My White Baby	Berlinale Talent Campus	Won	
2008	California Institute of the Arts	Good Hair	Academy of Motion Pictures Arts and Sciences Grant	Won	
2008	Detroit Docs	Intermittent Delight	Most Progressive Filmmaker Award	Won	
2008	Mexico International Film Festival	Me Broni Ba/My White Baby	Silver Palm Award	Won	
2009	Athens International Film and Video Festival	Me Broni Ba/My White Baby	Best Documentary Short	Won	
2009	Chicago Underground Film Festival	Me Broni Ba/My White Baby	Best Documentary Short	Won	
2010	Robert J. Flaherty Film Seminar	Work	Featured Artist	Won	
2010	Real Life Documentary Festival	Me Broni Ba/My White Baby	Special Jury Mention, Best Short Film	Won	
2011	Black Maria Film Festival	Drexciya	Jury's Citation Prize	Won	
2011	African Film Festival, Tarifa	Drexciya	Special Jury Mention	Won	
2011	Expresión en Corto International Film Festival	Drexciya	Best Experimental Short	Won	
2012	Focus Features Africa First	Kwaku Ananse	Production Grant	Won	
2012	Creative Capital Foundation	Black Sunshine	Film/Video Grant	Won	
2012	Art Matters Foundation	Kwaku Ananse	Post-Production Grant	Won	
2013	Ann Arbor Film Festival	Split Ends, I Feel Wonderful	Most Promising Filmmaker Prize	Won	
2013	Berlin International Film Festival	Kwaku Ananse	Golden Bear Best Short Film	Nominated	
2013	Africa Movie Academy Award	Kwaku Ananse	Best Short Film	Won	
2013	Académie des Arts et Techniques du Cinéma	Kwaku Ananse	Best Short Film of the Year	Won	
2013	Arte International Prize	Black Sunshine	Development Grant	Won	
2013	MacDowell Colony Fellowship	Black Sunshine	Screenwriting Grant	Won	
2014	Berlin International Film Festival	Black Sunshine	Production Grant	Won	
2015	Association Cinémas et Cultures d'Afrique	Kwaku Ananse	Special Jury Mention	Won	
2015	John Simon Guggenheim Memorial Foundation	Black Sunshine	Guggenheim Fellowship	Won	
2015	Tribeca Film Institute	Black Sunshine	Tribeca All Access Development Grant	Won	
2016	Berlin International Film Festival	Reluctantly Queer	Golden Bear for Best Short Film	Nominated	
2016	Berlin International Film Festival	Reluctantly Queer	Teddy Award for Best Short Film	Nominated	
2016	Baltimore International Black Film Festival	Reluctantly Queer	Audience Award for Best International Short Film	Won	
2016	The Camargo Foundation	Save the Rex	Travel Grant	Won	
2017	Africa Movie Academy Award	On Monday of Last Week	Best Short Film	Nominated	
2018	Pratt Institute	On Monday of Last Week	Mellon Research Grant	Won	
2018	International Short Film Festival Oberhausen	Oberhausen Film Seminar	Featured Artist	Won	
2018	Goethe-Institut Vila Sul Salvador-Bahia	Black Sunshine	Artist-in-Residence	Won	
2018	Cobo Center Marquee Video Art Series	Intermittent Delight	John S. and James L. Knight Foundation	Won	
2019	Wattis Institute for Contemporary Arts	Akosua Adoma Owusu: Welcome to the Jungle	The Westridge Foundation	Won	

== Filmography ==
=== Filmography ===
Year	Film	Role
2005	Ajube Kete	writer, director, producer, cinematographer
2006	Tea 4 Two	director, producer, cinematographer
2007	Intermittent Delight	director, producer, cinematographer
2008	Revealing Roots	actress, director, producer
2008	Boyant: A Michael Jordan in a Speedo is Far Beyond the Horizon	actress, producer
2009	Me Broni Ba	director, producer, cinematographer
2010-11	Drexciya	director, producer, cinematographer
2012	Split Ends, I Feel Wonderful	director, producer
2013	Kwaku Ananse	writer, director, producer
2015	Bus Nut	director, producer, cinematographer
2016	Reluctantly Queer	director, producer, cinematographer
2017	On Monday of Last Week	writer, director, producer
2018	Mahogany Too	director, producer, cinematographer
2019	Pelourinho: They Don't Really Care About Us	director, producer, cinematographer
2019	White Afro	director, producer, cinematographer
2020	King of Sanwi	director, producer, cinematographer
in production	Black Sunshine (feature film)	writer, director, producer
