= Kwaku Ananse (film) =

- Film poster
- Directed by: Akosua Adoma Owusu
- Written by: Iram Parveen Bilal; Akosua Adoma Owusu
- Story by: Akosua Adoma Owusu
- Starring: Jojo Abot; Koo Nimo; Grace Omaboe
- Cinematography: Pedro Gonzalez-Rubio
- Music by: Koo Nimo; Ebo Taylor
- Production company: Obibini Pictures LLC
- Distributed by: Grasshopper Film LLC; KweliTv
- Release date: February 12, 2013 (Berlin International Film Festival)
- Running time: 25 minutes
- Countries: Ghana; Mexico; United States
- Language: Akan

Kwaku Ananse is a 2013 short film directed by Akosua Adoma Owusu. The short film combines semi-autobiographical elements with the tale of Kwaku Ananse, a trickster in West African and Caribbean stories who appears as both a spider and a man. The fable of Kwaku Ananse is combined with the story of a young outsider named Nyan Koronhwea, who attends her estranged father's funeral. At the funeral, she retreats to the woods in search of her father. The film starred legendary musician Koo Nimo and veteran actress Grace Omaboe.

The screenplay was co-written by Pakistani-American filmmaker and entrepreneur Iram Parveen Bilal. The script was written for MaameYaa Boafo, a Pakistani born-Ghanaian actress, who was originally cast in the lead role as Nyan Koronhwea. However, the production team in New York City eventually decided to recast the character during the pre-production stage with Jojo Abot, an emerging Ghanaian artist.

== Synopsis ==
Drawing upon the rich mythology of Ghana, this magical short film combines semi-autobiographical elements from Owusu's life with local folklore to tell the story of a young American woman who returns to West Africa for her father's funeral, only to discover his hidden double identity.

Kwaku Ananse is a traditional West African fable about a being that is part man and part spider, who spends years collecting all the wisdom of the world in a wooden pot. As he tries to hide the pot in a tree, he can't find a way to place it high up in its branches. When his little son, Ntikuma shows him the way, Kwaku Ananse becomes so angered, he throws the pot down onto the ground. It bursts and the wisdom seeps away. Everyone rushes over, hoping to salvage what they can.

Nyan Koronhwea returns to her father Kwaku Ananse's native Ghana for his funeral. They had lost contact with each other a long time ago. She has mixed feelings about her father's double life with one family in Ghana and another in the United States. Overwhelmed by the funeral, she retreats to the spirit world in search for Kwaku Ananse.

== Awards ==
Kwaku Ananse was nominated for a Golden Bear at the Berlin International Film Festival and won the Best Short Film award at the 9th Africa Movie Academy Awards. The film also received a Special Jury Mention at the 2015 Association Cinémas et Cultures d'Afrique in Angers, France.

== See also ==
- List of Afrofuturist films
