= Reluctantly Queer =

- Directed by: Akosua Adoma Owusu
- Written by: Kwame Edwin Otu
- Starring: Kwame Edwin Otu
- Cinematography: Akosua Adoma Owusu
- Edited by: Akosua Adoma Owusu; Aaron Alexis Biscombe
- Music by: Falcone
- Production company: Obibini Pictures LLC
- Release date: 2016
- Running time: 8 minutes
- Countries: Ghana; United States

Reluctantly Queer is a short film directed by Akosua Adoma Owusu. The eight-minute film tells the story of a young Ghanaian man who struggles to reconcile his love for his mother with his same-sex desires. The film explores the complexity that many queer individuals face in owning and claiming their sexuality amidst relationships that do not conform with their sexual identity. The film was written by and stars Kwame Edwin Otu. and it was released in 2016 with funding support from the John Simon Guggenheim Memorial Foundation.

== Synopsis ==
The film is epistolary—structured around a letter written by the central character, a young man who has emigrated from Ghana to the United States of America. He is confronted by the reality of being in a new country. He writes a letter to his mother about his time overseas reflecting the struggle for love that he has for his mother, alongside his romantic and sexual experiences he has had with different lovers while living in America. He is shown of him lying in bed with multiple people including men, which reveals his experiences, and the choice of words in his letter.

He elaborates that even though he once could talk about everything with his mother, inside, he is fearful of what she might say and asks if she would still love “this self” the same way, or if everything would change. He misses home (specifically his mother) but he also understands that he cannot return to Ghana because he will not be able to be queer there as homosexuality there is criminalised.

Reluctantly Queer shows how queer individuals are forced to compartmentalize parts of themselves because of societal pressures and their upbringing until they can no longer do so anymore, and how living in a different context influences how an individual expresses their sexual identity.

== Cast ==
Kwame Edwin Otu stars as the young Ghanaian man.

== Awards ==
The film won the ‘Best International Short’ award at the Baltimore International Black Film Festival in 2016. At the 2016 Berlin International Film Festival, the film was nominated for ‘Best Short Film’ and ‘Teddy Best Short Film.’
