= Sullins College =

Methodist junior college for women in Bristol, Virginia, US

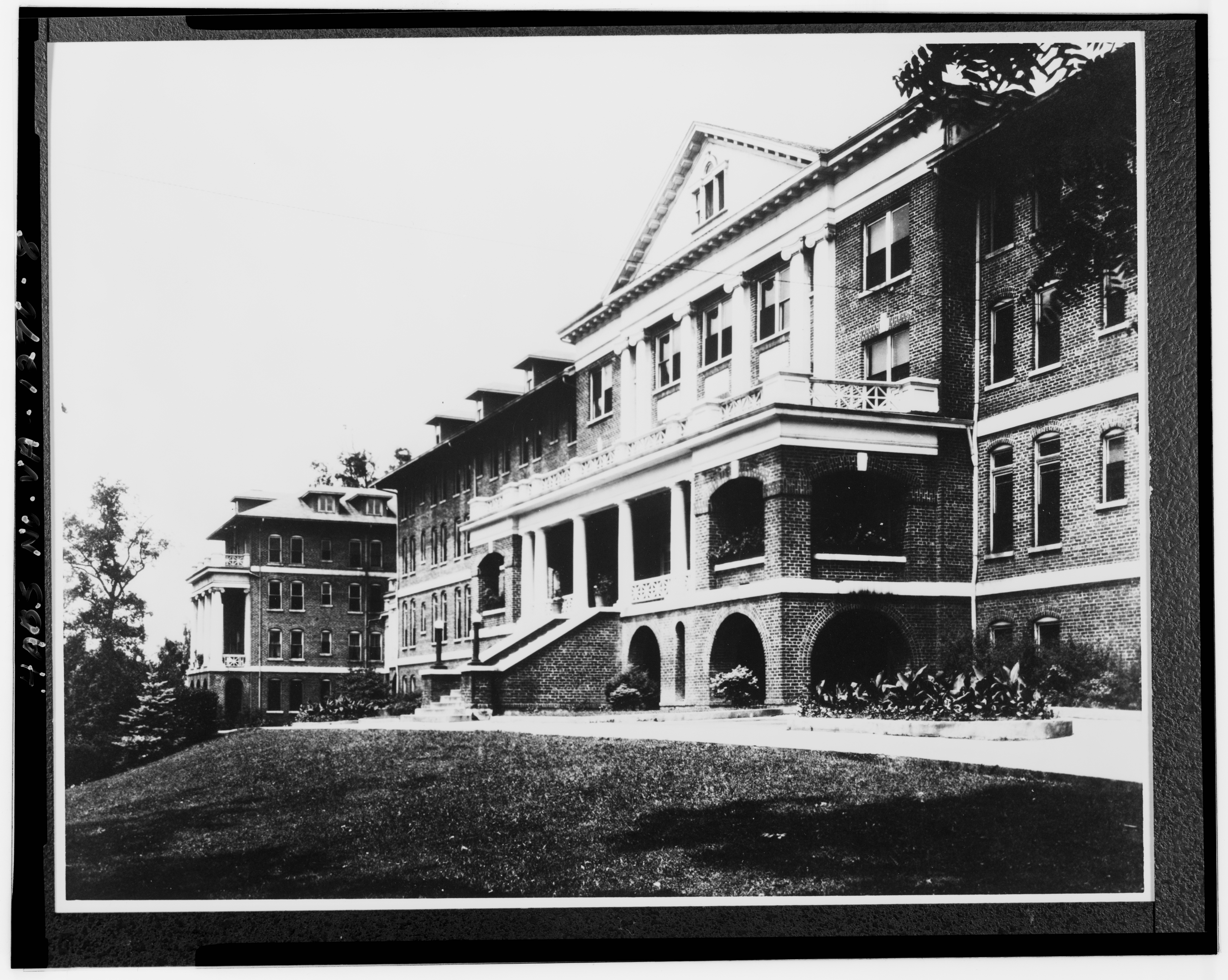
- Sullins College, Bristol, Virginia
- Type: Private, religious junior college
- Active: 1870–1976
- Religious affiliation: Methodist church
- Location: Bristol, Virginia, U.S. 36.60917°N 82.18944°W
- School newspaper: Reflector

Sullins College was a Methodist junior college for women in Bristol, Virginia, United States. Founded about 1868 and named for David Sullins, a Methodist minister, it ceased operations after the class of 1976 graduated.

== History ==
The institution was founded in 1870, and, in 1873, it became affiliated with the Methodist Church. It began as a high school and junior college. Its first location was in downtown Bristol.

The building burned during Christmas vacation in late December 1915, and the Methodist Church decided not to rebuild. Some of the residents of Bristol prevailed upon William E. Martin, a former president of the school-turned-Methodist pastor in Alabama, to return to Bristol and reopen the school. He did and the school was rebuilt in a new location in a residential area of Bristol that overlooked the city. No longer a Methodist institution, Martin operated it as a proprietary women's school controlled by his family. It attracted the daughters of wealthy families throughout the Southeast looking for a junior college with the prestige of a Virginia location. The new facility opened in September 1917.

In the 1930s, Martin opened a subsidiary institution, Arlington Hall, in the Virginia outskirts of Washington, D.C. During World War II, Arlington Hall was closed, and the facilities came under the control of the federal government, which operated it as an American Bletchley Park—a super secret facility where enemy radio messages were carefully decoded. The facility is still a government enterprise.

Sullins College in Bristol remained under the control of the Martin family until the 1960s, when they passed it to an independent board of trustees. The junior college celebrated its centennial in 1970. The college remained in operation and additional buildings were constructed. However, by the 1970s, women’s colleges were no longer as fashionable as they had once been, and as a two-year college, Sullins was particularly vulnerable to changing times. A peak enrollment of almost 400 in 1968 decreased rapidly so that by the fall of 1972 there were only 102 freshmen from 30 states and five foreign countries.

Facing a million-dollar debt in February 1975 and with inadequate enrollment, the trustees offered the school to the state of Virginia in exchange for the state assuming the school's debt. The state Council of Higher Education recommended against the acquisition, and the governor declined the offer in late October 1975. In early 1976, the school was valued at $16 million and the campus comprised 75 acres (30 ha) with 14 buildings in addition to the 50-acre (20 ha) Camp Sequyoa.

In April 1976, the board of trustees reached an agreement with the city to transfer the school to the city's school system to operate as a coeducational institution. The city would assume the school's $1.2 million debt, keep the name of the college and use the property only for educational purposes. The agreement with the city failed and following the graduation of the 1976 class, Sullins College closed in July. No alternative owner for the college developed. The property eventually passed to the United Coal Company, now known simply as the United Company, an investment firm.

King University, in Bristol, Tennessee, is the custodian of the Sullins College records and maintains an active relationship with alumnae of the institution.

== Student life ==
For most of its existence the college assumed responsibility for the behavior of its students in loco parentis. In 1911, the school expelled two women who went for a ride in a car with two men from nearby King College. While the college was holding the women for their parents to come get them, they eloped with the two men. Pursued by college officials and police officers into Tennessee, the couples married in Hawkins County a few minutes before their pursuers arrived. There was discussion about criminal charges for the two men involved.

The school newspaper was the Reflector.' A chapter of Phi Theta Kappa plus several student clubs operated on the campus. The school yearbook was the Sullins Sampler. In 1946, the Sampler placed third for the Methodist Award among more than 300 schools competing in a competition overseen by the Columbia Scholastic Press Association.

The graduating class of 1955 donated a group of five "Peter Pan" statues that were placed around a pool on the campus.

The school operated Camp Sequoya on South Holston Lake.

== Presidents ==
- David Sullins (1870–1915)
- William E. Martin (1916–)
- William T. Martin (in 1956)
- Claudius Pritchard (in 1972–1976)

== Sullins Academy ==
In 1966, Emmanuel Episcopal Church, using the resources from Highland Hill Day School, opened a kindergarten through second grade school, Episcopal Day School, in the church building. The school added grades until it became a K-8 school. In the process, it ran out of space at the church building. After the college closed in 1976, the school moved its operation to the campus' Martin Hall in the summer of 1977 taking the name Sullins Academy to better identify its non-sectarian nature. The academy remained there until 1999 when it moved to a newly constructed facility on 32 acres (13 ha) in Bristol, Virginia.

== Notable alumni ==
- Linda Garrou – member of the North Carolina General Assembly
- Judy Onofrio – Minnesota-based contemporary artist
- Katharine Smith Reynolds – philanthropist and builder of Reynolda House
- Marion Rice – American modern dance choreographer, teacher, and producer
- Lena Springs – Chair of Credentials Committee of Democratic National Committee and first woman to be nominated for Vice President of the United States at a national party convention

== Notes ==
- A History of Sullins College, 1870–1970 at Google Books, 1970, 28p.
