= Minnesota Artists Exhibition Program =

- Established: 1975
- Location: 2400 Third Avenue South, Minneapolis, Minnesota
- Website: artsmia.org/maep

The Minnesota Artists Exhibition Program (MAEP) is a curatorial program at the Minneapolis Institute of Arts that exhibits the work of artists living and working in the state of Minnesota. It is the only program of its kind in an American museum. An elected artist panel representing the Minnesota artist community meets quarterly to select fellow artists to exhibit their work at the MIA. All Minnesota artists (except MIA staff and degree-seeking students) are eligible to submit proposals. Artists who exhibit at the MIA receive access to the museum’s professional support services.

== History ==
Started in 1975 as a partnership between a group of regional artists and the Minneapolis Institute of Arts (MIA), the MAEP created an exhibition and programming space within the MIA. The initial year-long agreement was extended into an ongoing relationship between the Minnesota artist community and the MIA. The MAEP has now presented more than 180 exhibitions of contemporary art, exploring a wide range of topics, political viewpoints, and artistic styles. The program has featured solo and group shows, site-specific installations, retrospectives, and the once-every-decade exhibitions like Foot in the Door. In 2011, MAEP initiated the MCAD@MIA program, in which Minneapolis College of Art and Design (MCAD) students are invited to submit site-specific proposals to be installed at the MIA.

== MAEP Artist Panel ==
MAEP panelists play a direct role in the selection of MAEP exhibitions at the MIA. The panel is composed of seven members elected to two-year terms at the annual meeting, which is open to the public.

== Exhibitions & Programming ==
The core of the MAEP is an annual series of four exhibitions, selected by an elected artists’ panel, from proposals submitted online in response to open calls. MAEP also organizes "Foot in the Door" and "MCAD@MIA".

- "Foot in the Door" is a once every decade non-juried exhibition open to all artists working or living in Minnesota. In 2000, there were 1,700 submissions to Foot in the Door 2; in 2010 there were more than 4,500 submissions for "Foot in the Door 4".
- HOTTEA, Northern Spark 2012: "Letting Go",
- Broc Blegen, "The Coming Out Party: Selections from the Collection of Broc Blegen", 2012
- MCAD@MIA, "Field Inversion", artists Luke Axelson and Josh Ritenour, 2012
- Peter Happle Christian, "Ground Truths", 2011
- Marcus Young, "Semblances", 2011
- Natasha Pestich, "Xylander", 2011
- Roxanne Jackson, "We Believe in Something", 2009
- Andrea Stanislav, "River to Infinity", 2008
- Jim Denomie, "New Skins", 2007
- Selected exhibitions 1975–2012 (MAEPedia 1975–2008)

== Funding ==
Support for MAEP is provided by The McKnight Foundation and Jerome Foundation. The Jerome Foundation, which supports exhibitions of works by emerging Minnesota artists, cited the partnership between the artist community and the MIA as the program's strength.

== See also ==
- Arts in Minneapolis, Minnesota
