= Drexciya (2013 film) =

- Film poster
- Directed by: Simon Rittmeier
- Produced by: Academy of Media Arts Cologne; Sahelis Productions Ouagadougou
- Starring: Alexander Beyer; Rodrigue Ouattara; Adama Venegda; Josiane Hien Yeri
- Cinematography: Armin Dierolf
- Edited by: Heide Supper; Daniela Kinateder
- Music by: Ricky Ojijo
- Release date: 22 January 2013
- Running time: 28 minutes
- Countries: Germany, Burkina Faso
- Language: Dyula

Drexciya is a German-Burkinabe 2013 short film. The film premiered at the 2013 Film Festival Max Ophüls Preis in Saarbrücken, Germany.

== Synopsis ==
Thomas is a smuggler, shipping European refugees who hope to find a better life in Africa. One day his boat sinks and he is washed up on the African coast as the only survivor. He then makes his way to the nearest city - Drexciya.

== Screenings ==
- Film festival Max Ophüls Preis 2013, Saarbrücken, Germany
- International Film Festival 2013, Pristina, Kosovo
- Okayafrica - The Future Weird: Black Atlantis, New York 2013, USA
- The Shadows Took Shape - Studio Museum Harlem, New York 2014, USA
- Goethe-Institut Washington, USA 2014
- Goethe-Institut Ouagadougou, Burkina Faso 2014
