= Drexciya (2010 film) =

- Film poster
- Directed by: Akosua Adoma Owusu
- Cinematography: Dustin Thompson; Akosua Adoma Owusu
- Edited by: Dustin Thompson
- Production company: Obibini Pictures LLC
- Distributed by: Grasshopper Film LLC
- Release date: November 11, 2010
- Running time: 12 minutes
- Country: Ghana

Drexciya is a Ghanaian 2010 short documentary film directed and produced by Akosua Adoma Owusu in association with California Institute of the Arts (CalArts). The film had its theatrical premiere at the 2011 International Film Festival Rotterdam and participated in Video Studio: Changing Same at the Studio Museum in Harlem, New York.

== Synopsis ==
Drexciya portrays an abandoned public swimming facility located in Accra, Ghana set on the Riviera. The Riviera at one time was an upscale development, consisting of luxury high-rises and five star hotels. Since the 1970s, the Riviera has fallen into a disheveled state. This short documentary was inspired by afro-futurist myths propagated by the underground Detroit-based band Drexciya. They suggest that Drexciya is a mythical underwater subcontinent populated by the unborn children of African women thrown overboard during the Trans-Atlantic slave trade. These children have adapted and evolved to breathe underwater.

== Screenings ==
- 9th International Festival Signes de Nuit, Paris 2011
- IndieLisboa 2011
- Viennale 2011
- Huesca International Film Festival 2011
- Festival del cinema africano, d'Asia e America Latina di Milano 2011
- Rencontres Internationales Paris/Berlin/Madrid 2011
- Toronto International Film Festival, 2012
- OkayAfrica - The Future Weird: Black Atlantis, New York 2013, USA
- Tabakalera, 2015 Spain
- Institute of Contemporary Art, Philadelphia, 2015 USA
- Detroit Institute of Arts, 2016, USA
- Posthuman Complicities at mumok, 2017 Vienna, Austria
- Labocine, 2018
- 20th FestCurtasBH, 2018 Brasil

== Awards ==
- Best Experimental Film - Guanajuato International Film Festival 2011
- Mención Especial al Cortometraje, 8th African Film Festival, Tarifa 2011
- Top 10 African films of 2011
- Juror's Citation Prize - Black Maria Film & Video Festival 2011
- Camera in the Sun
