= Rochester Art Center =

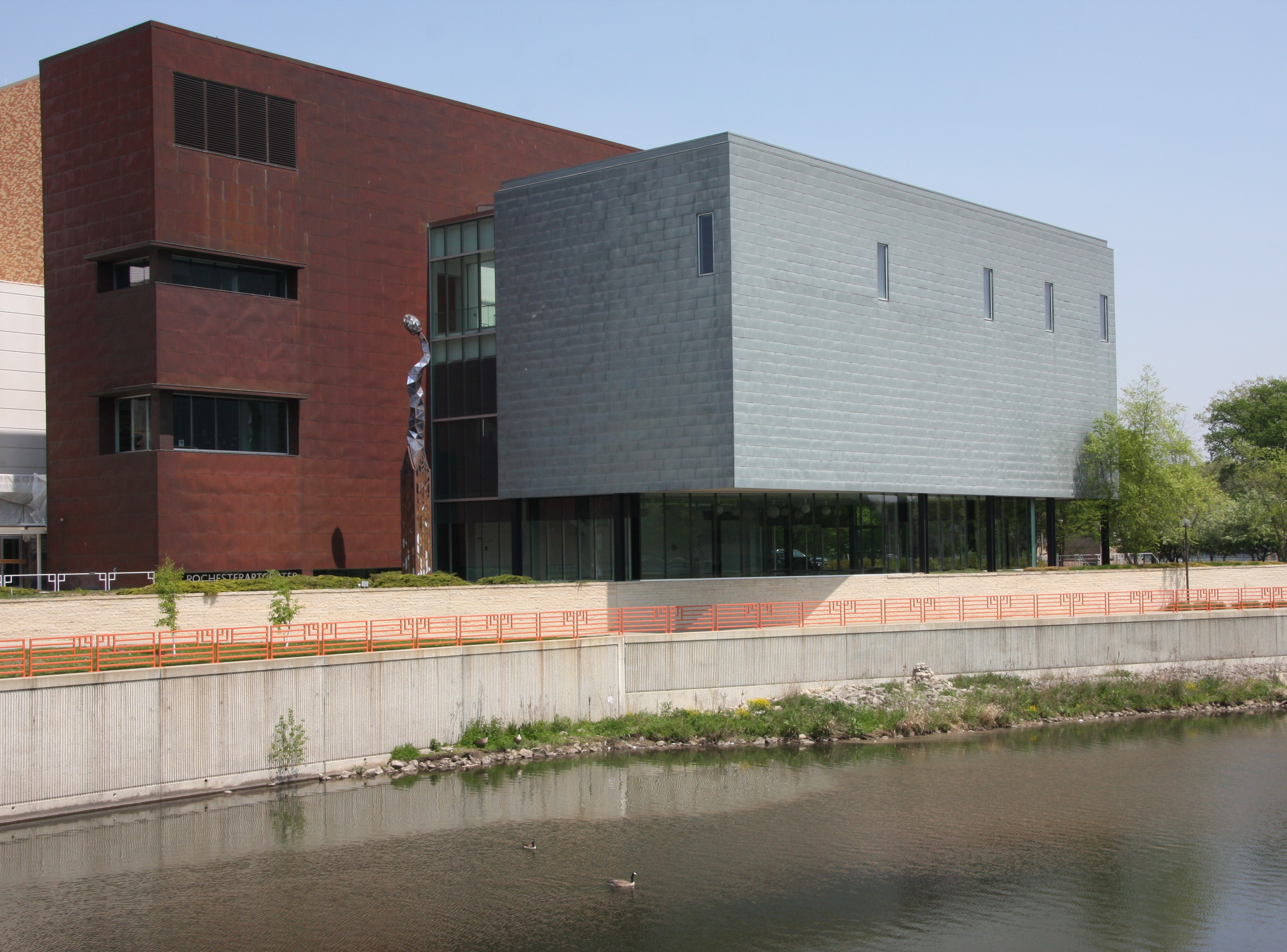
- The Rochester Art Center in 2016
- Established: 1946
- Location: 40 Civic Center Dr SE; Rochester, Minnesota, United States
- Coordinates: 44°01′17″N 92°27′30″W
- Type: Art Center
- Public transit access: RPT
- Website: www.rochesterartcenter.org

The Rochester Art Center is a contemporary arts center in Rochester, Minnesota, United States. The Center offers exhibitions of local, national and international art, as well as tours, classes, and workshops.

Founded in 1946, the Center opened in its current location in 2004. The 36,000 square-foot building was designed by Hammel, Green and Abrahamson. Its main gallery is named in recognition of the artist Judy Onofrio.
