= Jojo Abot =

Ghanaian artist and musician (born 1988)

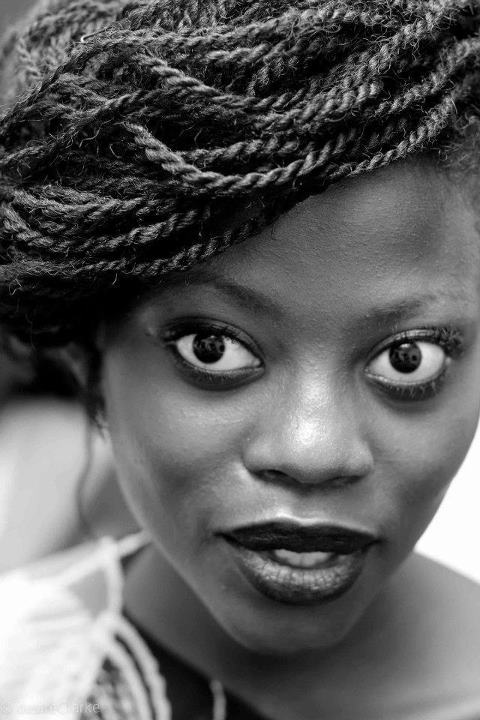
Jojo Abot (born 4 August 1988) is a Ghanaian/American singer/songwriter and actress.

Jojo Abot (born 4 August 1988) is a Ghanaian artist and musician, based in Brooklyn, New York City. Her creative output spans video direction, acting, modeling, singing and multimedia performance. Abot's work taps into her home country, using her first language, Ewe, as a source to title her work and as a point of origin for musical inspiration. Her musical inspirations include Fela Kuti and Ebo Taylor. Abot has toured and performed with Kuti’s youngest son Seun Kuti, as well as rapper Common and Bob Marley’s son Stephen. She has also supported Lauryn Hill, whose influence can also be felt alongside that of Eryka Badu.

Abot's origin story and family history play an important role in her musical work. For instance, her grandmother's name FYFA WOFO inspired the name of her debut album in 2016. FYFA WOFO centers around a narrative in which an African woman becomes pregnant with a white man's child. Abot developed FYFA WOFO into a multimedia project while she participated in NEW INC, the New Museum's incubator for artists, designers and technologists.

Abot's music bends genres and is inspired by jazz, afropunk, hip hop and soul, as well as tribal and indigenous sounds. She is concerned with themes ranging from black empowerment, personal histories, identity and spirituality. Her second EP, NGIWUNKULUNKULU, was released in 2018. NGIWUNKULUNKULU translates to "I am God" in Zulu and is the result of her personal identity exploration in reaction to apartheid's lasting impact in Johannesburg, South Africa. Both NGIWUNKULUNKULU and FYFA WOFO showcase Abot's signature sound and style, which she calls “afro-hypno-sonic,” a blend of Afrobeat, futuristic soul and electronic beats.

In 2018, Abot was an artist in residence at National Sawdust. Later on September 24, 2022 National Sawdust hosted the première of the immersive and experiential opera, "A Good of Her Own Making," written and created by Jojo Abot in collaboration with five-time Grammy winning musician and restorative arts devotee, Esperanza Spalding.
