= Anne Cannon Forsyth =

American heiress and education activist (1930–2003)

- Born: August 23, 1930; New York City, New York
- Died: May 11, 2003 (aged 72); Winston-Salem, North Carolina
- Occupation: Educational activist
- Children: 2
- Parent(s): Zachary Smith Reynolds; Anne Cannon Stouffer

Anne Cannon Forsyth (August 23, 1930 – May 11, 2003) was a Cannon textiles and R.J. Reynolds tobacco families heiress, and education activist who created the Anne C. Stouffer Foundation in 1967, which was the first foundation to offer full scholarships for young African-American students to attend elite southern preparatory boarding schools. She also served as founder and president of the North Carolina Fund. The Anne Cannon Trust awarded $100,000 to Appalachian State University to provide educational scholarships to underrepresented populations.

== Educational activism ==
Born into a wealthy family in Winston-Salem, North Carolina, Forsyth felt the need to help under-represented people. Specifically, Forsyth was concerned with the problems of poverty and racism. She began her work helping this cause by creating the Anne C. Stouffer Foundation in 1967, which aimed to "promote the integration of southern preparatory schools". Shortly after, John Ehle took over management of the program; Ehle and his wife, the actress Rosemary Harris, can be heard interviewing prospective Black candidates on surviving recordings. The Anne C. Stouffer Foundation largely helped integrate the Virginia Episcopal School in 1967, Bill Alexander and Marvin Barnard were among the first two to attend. That same year, the Stouffer Foundation also helped break the racial barrier at Saint Andrew's School in Boca Raton, Florida. Forsyth rationalized starting the program because of the benefits she believed both black and white students would acquire. The foundation over the course of its operation from 1967 to 1975 enabled 142 students, mainly African Americans, to attend prep schools throughout the southern United States.

== Family ==
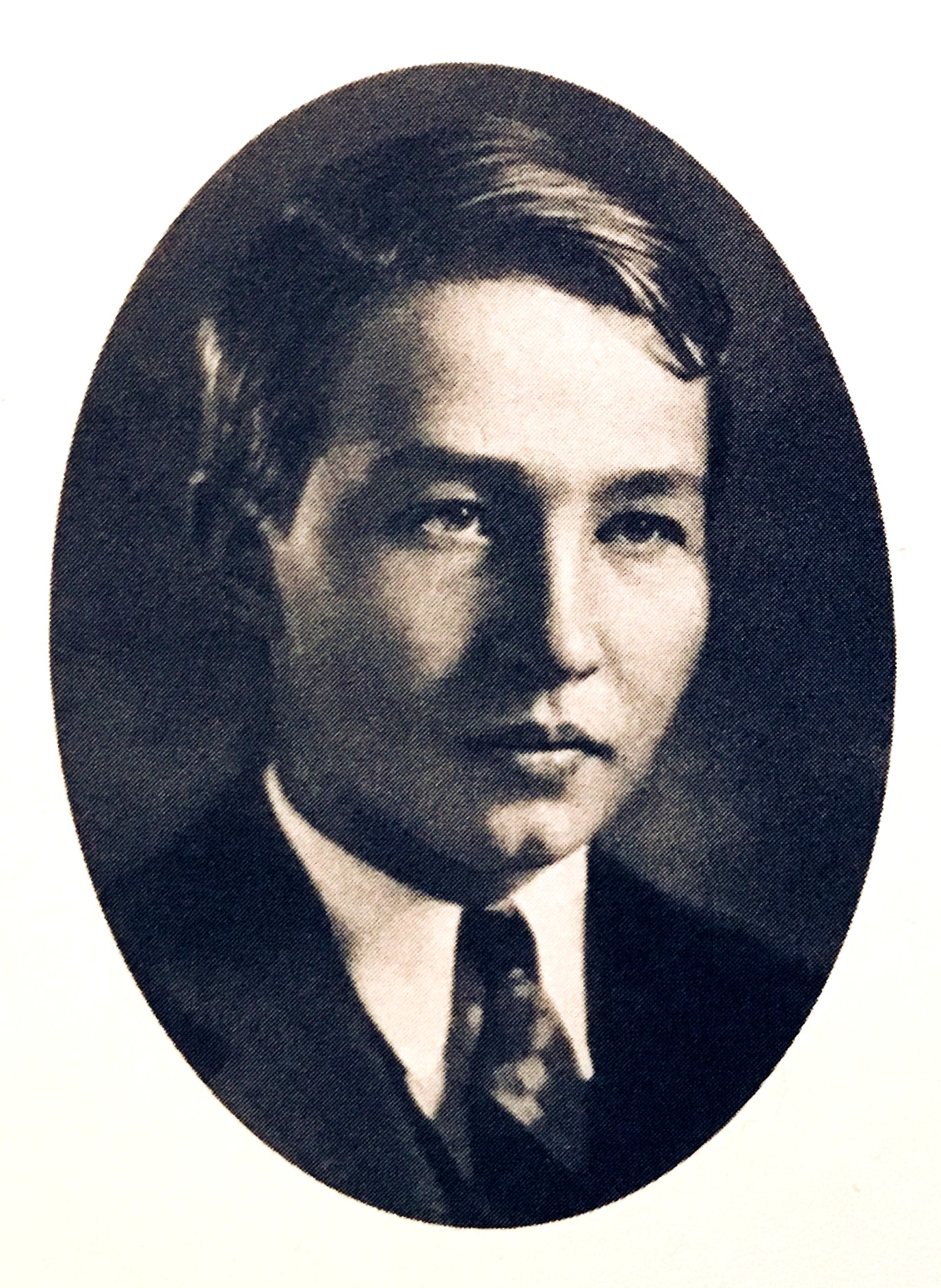
Cannon Forsyth's father, Z. Smith Reynolds, in early 1930s

Anne Cannon Forsyth was the daughter of Zachary Smith Reynolds and Anne Cannon Stouffer. Forysth had a tumultuous childhood after the divorce of her parents and the early death of her father.

Forsyth was adopted by her grandparents, Joseph (1876–1939) and Annie (1887–1965) Cannon. They lived in the Cannon's Blowing Rock, North Carolina estate named "Miramichi," meaning "happy retreat." As an heiress to both the R.J. Reynolds tobacco and Cannon textile fortunes, she was once dubbed "the richest baby in the world." Following the sensational Lindbergh kidnapping in 1932, the Cannons received a death threat saying "You're next," in reference to the little Anne. They hired full time Pinkerton agents who watched the child at all times, and iron bars were installed on the "Miramichi" windows.

Forsyth has two sons, Zachary Tate and Jock Tate, both involved in the Z. Smith Reynolds Foundation.

== Legacy ==
In August 2006, the Anne Cannon Trust was founded in Forsyth's honor. It funded 20 scholarships for students of under-represented groups to attend Appalachian State University. Forsyth also founded the Awards Committee for Education (ACE), which funded scholarships for high achieving Native American and African American high school students from Appalachia for summer programs.
