= William Neal Reynolds =

American businessman (1863–1951)

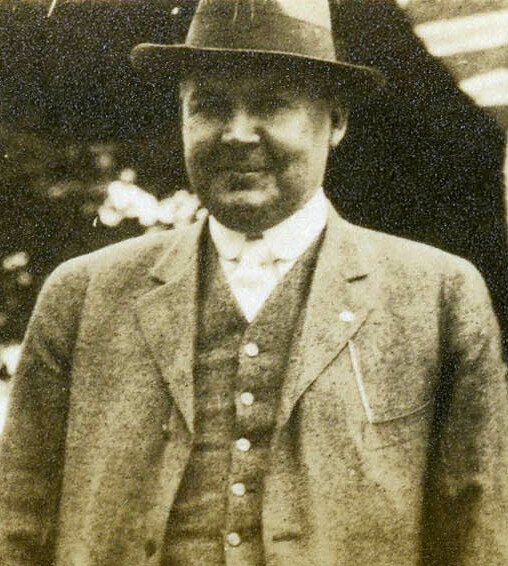
- William Neal Reynolds in 1914
- Born: March 22, 1863; Patrick County, Virginia
- Died: September 10, 1951 (aged 88)
- Education: Duke University
- Occupation: Chief executive of R.J. Reynolds Tobacco Company
- Spouse: Kate Bitting Reynolds
- Children: (raised brother's children); Richard Joshua Reynolds Jr. (1906-1964); Mary Katherine Reynolds (1908-1953); Nancy Susan Reynolds (1910-1985); Zachary Smith Reynolds (1911-1932)
- Honors: United States Harness Racing Hall of Fame (1958)

William Neal Reynolds (March 22, 1863 – September 10, 1951) was an American sportsman and businessman with R. J. Reynolds Tobacco Company, which was founded by his brother R. J. Reynolds.

== Early life ==
Born in Patrick County, Virginia, Reynolds went to work for his brother in Winston-Salem, North Carolina in 1881 as he worked himself through Trinity College (later Duke University). From 1890 to 1940, Reynolds served as a director of Reynolds Co. He served as the first vice-president of the company until he took over the presidency in 1918.

== Chief executive of R.J. Reynolds ==
Always called "Mr. Will," Reynolds took over the presidency of the company after his brother's death from cancer in 1918; he turned the presidency over in 1924 to Bowman Gray Sr. The company then turned from "the dominance of its founder into the less personal sphere of corporate life." Reynolds became the first chairman of the board of directors of Reynolds Co. in 1924 until 1931 and then served as chairman of the board's executive committee until 1941.

== Personal life ==
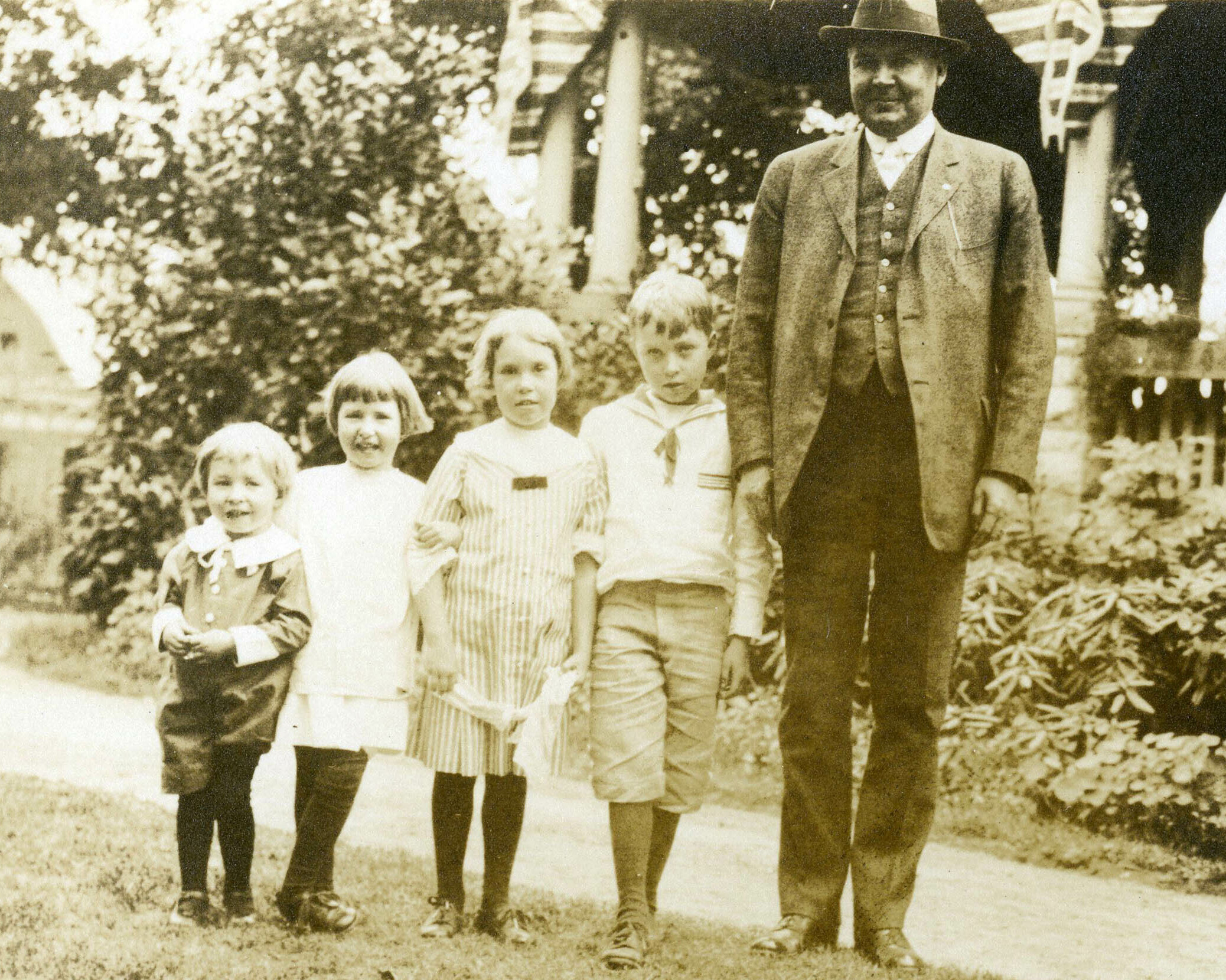
William Neal Reynolds with, from right to left, R.J. "Dick" Jr., Mary, Nancy, and Zachary "Smith" Reynolds

Reynolds married Kate G. Bitting in 1889.

Reynolds was the first president of the Forsyth Country Club and commissioned a nine-hole golf course to be built. After eight years, in 1921, he brought in famed golf course designer Donald Ross to design an 18-hole course. In 1925, Reynolds founded another golf course, Roaring Gap, about an hour away from Winston-Salem and also designed by Ross.

R.J. Reynolds' widow Katharine died in 1924, and their four children were then raised by William Reynolds and his wife, Kate. Reynolds and Kate had no children of their own.

The youngest Reynolds child, Zachary Smith Reynolds, called "Smith," was seven when his mother died. Smith died mysteriously of a gunshot wound to the head at his parents' estate, Reynolda House, on July 6, 1932. His pregnant wife, broadway starlet Libby Holman, and best friend Albert Walker were indicted for the murder, in a sensational case that garnered national attention. Reynolds contacted the district attorney and asked for the charges against his nephew's alleged killers to be dropped; the prosecutor eventually did so for lack of evidence, and no trial on the matter was ever held. The Z. Smith Reynolds Foundation was established in Smith Reynolds' name by Smith Reynolds' siblings and by Reynolds. The foundation lured Wake Forest University away from its location 100 miles (160 km) away in Wake Forest, North Carolina, to establish a new campus on the grounds of Reynolda House and receive an annual endowment from the foundation.

Reynolds also built a hospital in Winston-Salem specifically for African-Americans, named the Kate Bitting Reynolds Memorial Hospital in honor of his wife. In honor of his mother, he founded the Nancy Reynolds School in Stokes County, North Carolina, and the Hardin Reynolds School in Patrick County, Virginia, to honor his father. The Kate B. Reynolds Trust uses one-fourth of the income collected each year from its more than two million shares of R.J. Reynolds Co. stock to help the "poor and needy" in Winston-Salem.

The Reynolds family donated $100,000 towards the construction of a coliseum at North Carolina State University. Because of this gift, it was named Reynolds Coliseum in his honor.

== Tanglewood ==
Reynolds built a 1,117-acre (4.52 km^{2}) country estate on the Yadkin River near Winston-Salem, Tanglewood Park Arboretum and Rose Garden, and moved into it in 1921. Reynolds owned and bred Standardbred harness racing horses at Tanglewood for competition. In the racing season of 1909 to 1910, one of Reynolds' horses won 15 of 17 races conducted. He also owned interests in horse farms in Lexington, Kentucky, and Florida. Reynolds was active in the harness racing industry and was a member of the Grand Circuit, the Hambletonian Society, and a founding member and trustee of the Hall of Fame of the Trotter. In 1958 he was inducted as an Immortal into the Hall of Fame.

He eventually donated Tanglewood to Forsyth County for use as a park. Today, Tanglewood has three golf courses: an 18-hole par 3 course, the Reynolds Course, and the Championship Course, which hosted the 1974 PGA Championship and was the site of a Champions Tour event from 1987-2002. Tanglewood also has horseback riding, bicycling, swimming and boating.
