= Mary Reynolds Babcock =

American philanthropist

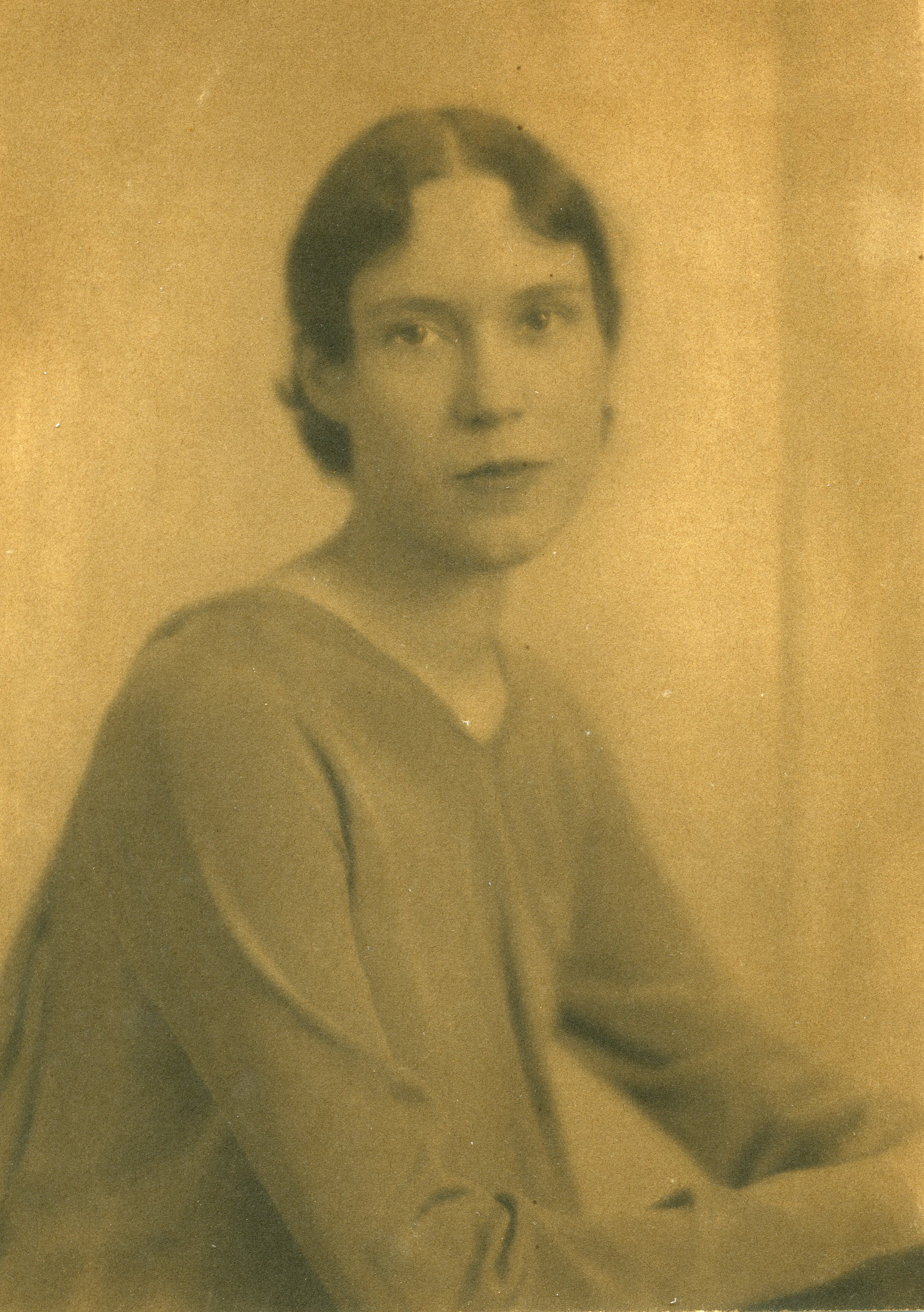
- Born: Mary Katharine Reynolds; August 8, 1908; Winston-Salem, North Carolina, U.S.
- Died: July 17, 1953 (aged 44); New York City, U.S.
- Spouse: Charles Babcock
- Parent(s): R. J. Reynolds and Katharine Smith Reynolds
- Relatives: R. J. Reynolds Jr.; Zachary Smith Reynolds

Mary Reynolds Babcock (August 8, 1908 – July 17, 1953) was an American heiress and philanthropist. As the daughter of R.J Reynolds and Katharine Smith Reynolds, she inherited a considerable fortune generated by the company her father built, the nationally prominent R. J. Reynolds Tobacco Company. She was a founder for both the Z. Smith Reynolds Foundation and the Mary Reynolds Babcock Foundation. She and her husband Charles Babcock gifted Wake Forest University 350 acres, and the university moved to Winston-Salem, North Carolina.

== Biography ==
Mary Reynolds Babcock was born in 1908 in Winston-Salem, North Carolina, as the second child to tobacco tycoon R. J. Reynolds and his wife Katharine Smith Reynolds. She was preceded by her brother R.J. "Dick" Reynolds Jr, and her younger siblings Nancy Susan Reynolds and Zachary Smith Reynolds followed in 1910 and 1911 respectively. The family lived at 666 West Fifth Street in Winston-Salem in a large Queen Anne mansion, designed by architect George Franklin Barber. Fifth street was labeled as "Millionaire's Row" for the number of Reynolds family members, high-ups in R.J. Reynolds tobacco company, and other tobacco or textile industrialists who lived there. The house was located conveniently to the Reynolds offices at the intersection of Fifth and Main.

While R.J. Reynolds continued to work regularly building his tobacco empire, Katharine Reynolds managed the household and regularly entertained fellow Winston-Salem socialites. She also was a member of the New Women organization. Prior to her marriage in 1905, she began studying business at the State Normal and Industrial School in Greensboro, North Carolina, completing her bachelor's degree at Sullins College in Bristol, Virginia. After graduating, Katharine worked as R.J.'s stenographer and secretary, and he taught her to invest in the stock market. Through purchasing her own stocks, she was able to develop her own independent income; at a time when only 5% of men owned stock, and even fewer women, she was able to take in $10,000 in less than eighteen months. Her management skills aided her in creating a local chapter of the YMCA, in which she served as President, and Junior League. Her independent wealth, alongside that of her husband, allowed for her to participate extensively in philanthropy, donating generously to a variety of causes such as the creation of hospitals and orphanages.

=== Reynolda Estate Era ===
Around 1905 Katharine Reynolds, with the full financial support of her husband, began to design a family estate named Reynolda. Following the purchase of over 1,000 acres of land north of Winston-Salem, she worked extensively with architects, landscape artists, and agriculture specialists to create not a self-sufficient model farm on the estate, in order to exhibit and provide education on the most modern agriculture techniques. In the style of an English country estate worker housing was built, with a village with cottages provided for white estate workers, and another community, "Five Row", built for black workers.

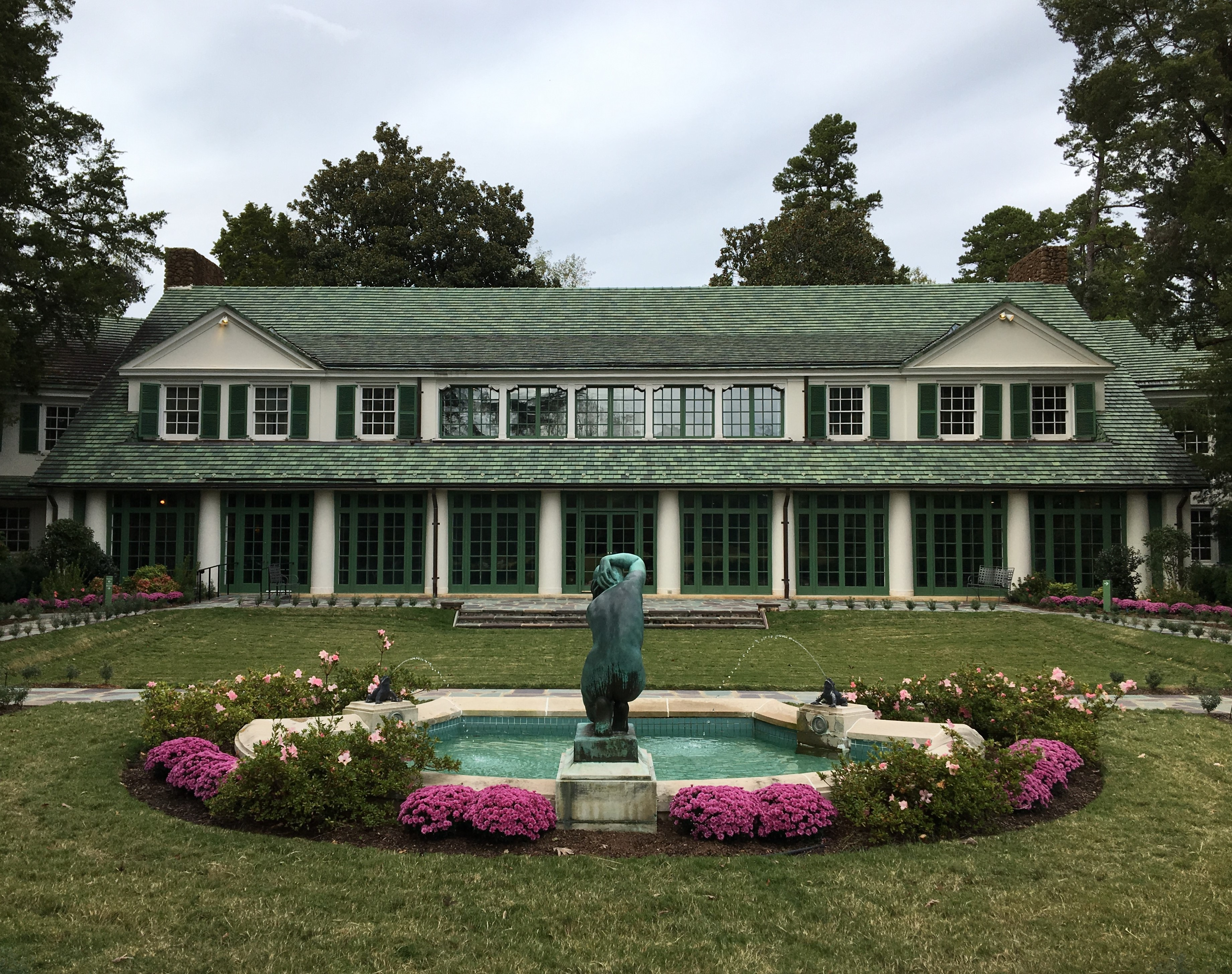
Front facade of Reynolda House showing the forecourt garden

Construction of Reynolda House was officially completed in 1917, in time for the family to move in for the Christmas season. However, R.J. Reynolds was unable to enjoy it long, as he died July 1918 at the age of 68 of suspected pancreatic cancer. Mary was 9 years old. In 1921, her mother married J. Edward Johnston, a teacher who worked at the estate's private school who was about 13 years Katharine's junior. Mary wrote in her diary after the marriage: "“At about 7:15, Mother was married to Mr. Johnston. The affair was very quiet. Smith was ring bearer, and Nancy and myself were flower girls. We are trying to keep it quiet, but about the [whole] town knows it.”

In 1921, a playhouse was constructed for Mary and Nancy in the gardens adjoining the house. The building was designed to resemble an English cottage, with furniture sized for young girls. Friends of Mary and Nancy interviewed in 1980 remembered having sleepovers in the playhouse. Aurelia Spaugh recalled: "We also used to spend the night in the playhouse, quite a lot... You were always well chaperoned, at least to a point. What I mean is you always could sneak out. Remember the books we read? And we’d put an Elsie Dinsmore cover on the Sheik of Araby, something like that..."

As a child, Mary Reynolds went to a small private school within Reynolda Village, then to the Salem Academy. This was followed by Miss Wright's School, a finishing school in Bryn Mawr, Pennsylvania. After graduating she went to Paris and studied art, which became a passion of hers.

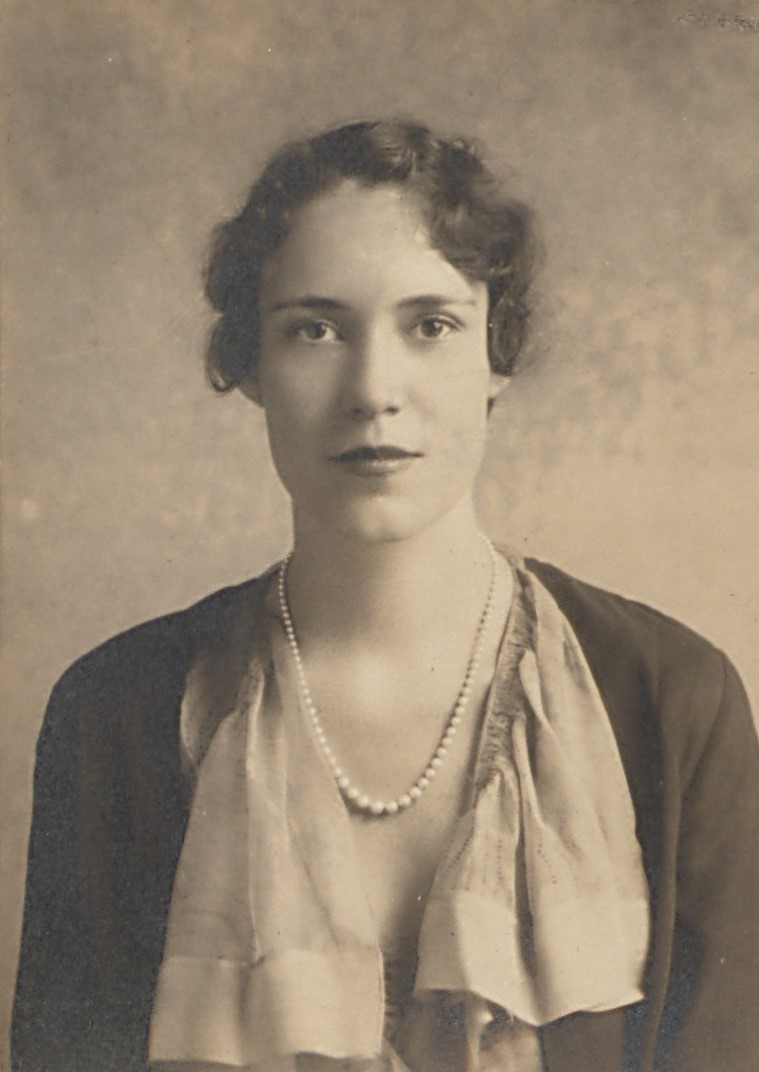
Mary Reynolds Babcock ca. 1930s

In 1924, Katharine gave birth to J. Johnston Jr. She died suddenly three days later of an embolism. The estate was then held in trust by J. Johnston and Will Reynolds, R.J. Reynolds' brother. Estate workers were kept on to maintain the property for the Reynolds' children's use. The children began the vacate the house as they grew older. R.J. Reynolds Jr. moved to New York to run his aviation business; Smith Reynolds was sent to attend Woodberry Forest School in Virginia.

In December 1929, Mary Reynolds married Charles Henry Babcock, son of an investment banking family from Philadelphia. The wedding ceremony was performed at Reynolda in front of the fireplace in the main hall; in January 1930, her sister Nancy married in the same spot. The Babcocks set up their main residence in Greenwich, Connecticut, returning to Reynolda for vacations or holidays.

In 1932, Babcock and her siblings rushed back to Winston-Salem at the news of their brother Smith's death.

In 1936, Mary inherited thirty million dollars left her by her father. At this point in her life, she was considered to be one of the wealthiest women in the world. With this money, she made many donations to various causes with a focus on local education.

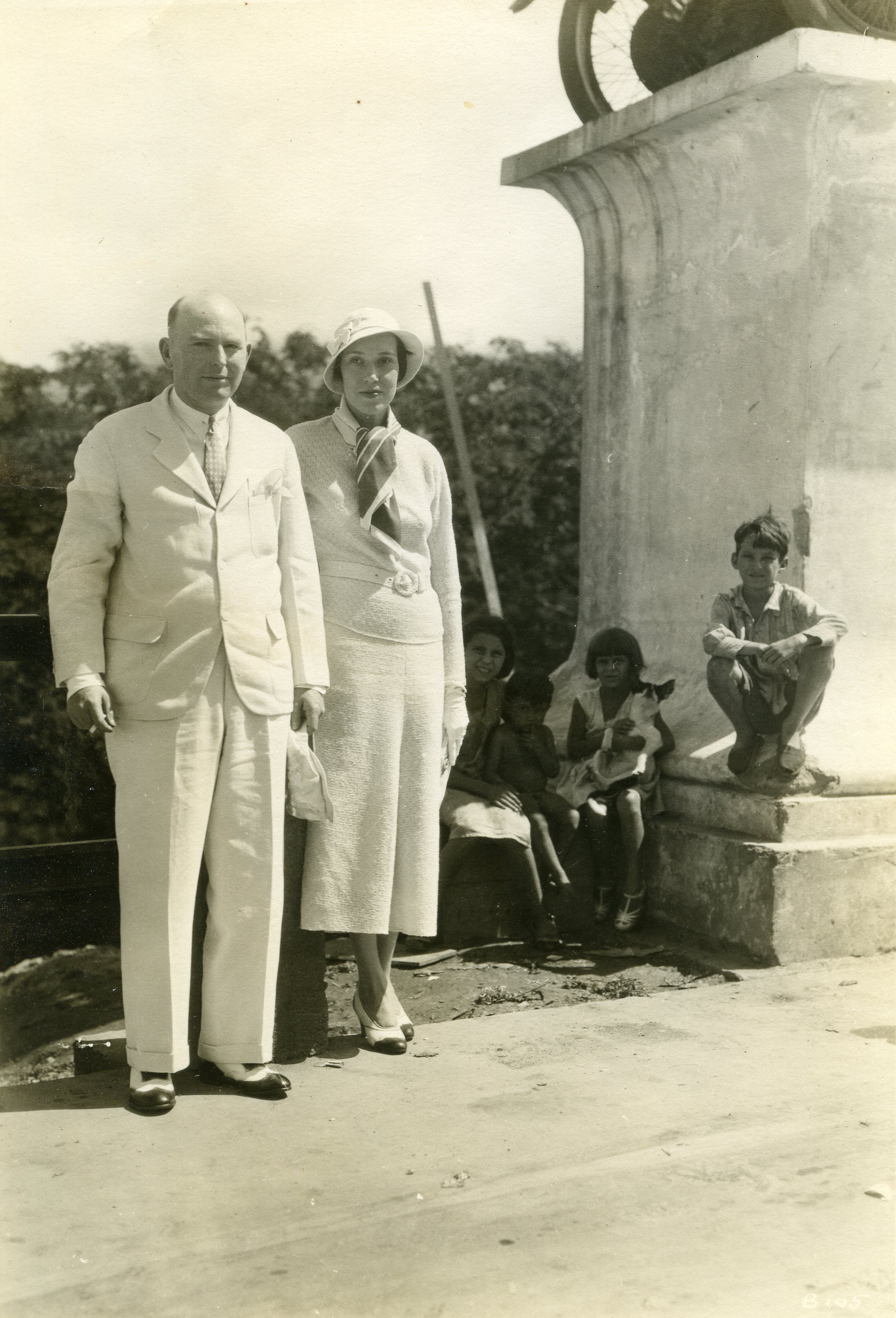
Mary Reynolds Babcock and her husband Charles Babcock, 1941

After moving permanently to the estate, Babcock became increasingly concerned about rising costs of maintenance. Winston-Salem's city limits were redrawn in 1940, then including Reynolda. The family worried over the new burden of city taxes. Mary wrote to her sister, Nancy, that “we all know that the day of big estates is passing. I’m planning to sell off the church side of the road right after the war in pieces, selling as much as the town can absorb. Property around the Old Town Club will be sold after that, probably 10 or 12 years later. But the big house and gardens etc. are what cause upkeep expense."

Originally, Babcock envisioned selling 500 acres to establish a veterans hospital, but the idea was met with ire in her circle. In a letter to her sister, she wrote: "Everyone I asked blew up over Reynolda becoming a vets’ hospital...I guess Reynolda will go on to live a longer life and end as an ancient ruin.” When the Z. Smith Reynolds Foundation offered Wake Forest University annual financial assistance in return for the college moving to Winston-Salem, she donated the initial 350 acres for the new university's grounds, eventually to a total gift of 605 acres. A groundbreaking ceremony for the new campus was held in 1951 and attended by President Harry S. Truman, who gave the keynote speech of the day. A lunch reception was held in Reynolda's central reception room; afterwards President Truman took a nap on the sofa of R.J. Reynolds' study.

== Legacy ==
Babcock died of stomach cancer in New York City in 1953. She died and was buried in Winston-Salem at the Reynolds family plot in Salem Cemetery.

One of Babcock's most notable philanthropist donations was the initial gift of land from the family estate for the relocation of Wake Forest University. From 1952 to 1956, 14 buildings were constructed on the Winston-Salem campus. The school was officially moved to Winston-Salem in the summer of 1956.

Mary Reynolds Babcock started the Z. Smith Reynolds Foundation in 1933, after the death of her brother, Zachary Smith Reynolds. It had a broad mandate to support the 'betterment of mankind and furtherance of the public welfare'. Upon her death in 1953, her will provided twelve million dollars for the establishment of the Mary Reynolds Babcock Foundation, a philanthropic organization for the benefit of North Carolinians, particularly to "help people and places to move out of poverty and achieve greater social and economic justice."

By the 1960s, the Reynolds' wealth had passed into the hands of a second generation of family members who were far removed from the political and economic struggles of the workplace. They played no role in the day-to-day management of Reynolds Tobacco. They took their cues instead from the culture of mid-twentieth-century American philanthropy, which puts its faith in social engineering and the use of private wealth to advance the common welfare. Some examples include Alliance for Appalachia, Blueprint NC, and Federation of Child Care Centers of Alabama. In the 1960s, both foundations were controlled by interlocking boards composed primarily of Reynolds family members, including Charles (Charlie) H. Babcock, Mary Reynolds's husband; R.J. Reynolds Jr.; and Anne Reynolds Forsyth, Zachary Smith Reynold's daughter from his first marriage.
