= R. J. Reynolds =

American businessman (1850–1918)

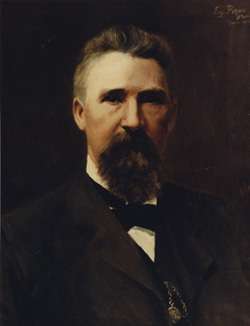
- R.J. Reynolds, head of Reynolds Tobacco Company
- Born: Richard Joshua Reynolds; July 20, 1850; Patrick County, Virginia, U.S.
- Died: July 29, 1918 (aged 68); Winston-Salem, North Carolina, U.S.
- Resting place: Salem Cemetery (Winston-Salem, North Carolina)
- Education: Emory & Henry College; Bryant & Stratton College
- Occupation: Owner of R.J. Reynolds Tobacco Company
- Spouse: Katharine Smith (m. 1905–1918)
- Children: 4 including; Dick, Mary. Zachary

Richard Joshua Reynolds (July 20, 1850 – July 29, 1918) was an American businessman and founder of the R. J. Reynolds Tobacco Company.

The son of a tobacco farmer and major enslaver, he worked for his father and attended Emory & Henry College from 1868 to 1870, eventually graduating from Bryant & Stratton Business College in Baltimore. He sold his share of the family business in 1874 and moved south to Winston (now Winston-Salem), North Carolina, to start his own tobacco company. Reynolds was a savvy businessman and a hard worker, and he quickly became one of the wealthiest citizens of Winston-Salem; eventually, he was the wealthiest person in the state of North Carolina. He died in 1918 of pancreatic cancer.

== Biography ==
=== Early life ===
Reynolds was born on July 20, 1850, at Rock Spring Plantation near Critz, Patrick County, Virginia. He was the son of Nancy Jane Cox Reynolds and Hardin Reynolds, a tobacco farmer. He grew fond of the tobacco business by helping his father.

=== R. J. Reynolds Tobacco Company ===
In 1874, Reynolds sold his interest in the family tobacco business to his father and left Patrick County to start his own tobacco company. He needed a railroad hub for his business, and since there was not one in Patrick County, he went to the nearest one, Winston, North Carolina. Winston and Salem were separate towns at that time. By 1875, Reynolds had established his tobacco manufacturing operation, and in the first year, it produced 150,000 pounds of tobacco. Although Winston-Salem alone had 15 other tobacco companies, Reynolds was able to distinguish himself through his business acumen and innovative techniques, including adding saccharin to chewing tobacco. By the 1890s, production had increased to millions of pounds annually.

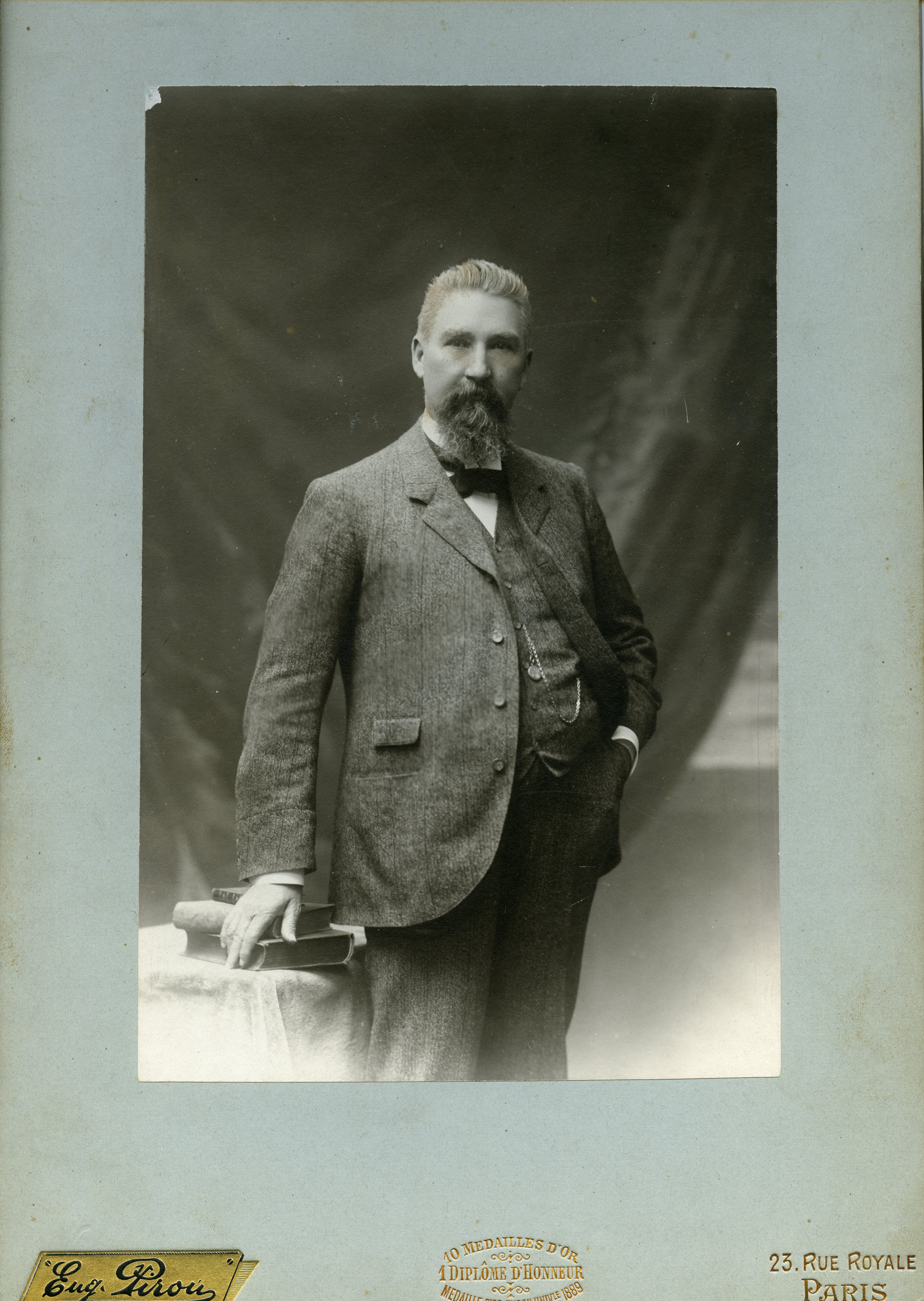
R.J. Reynolds in 1905

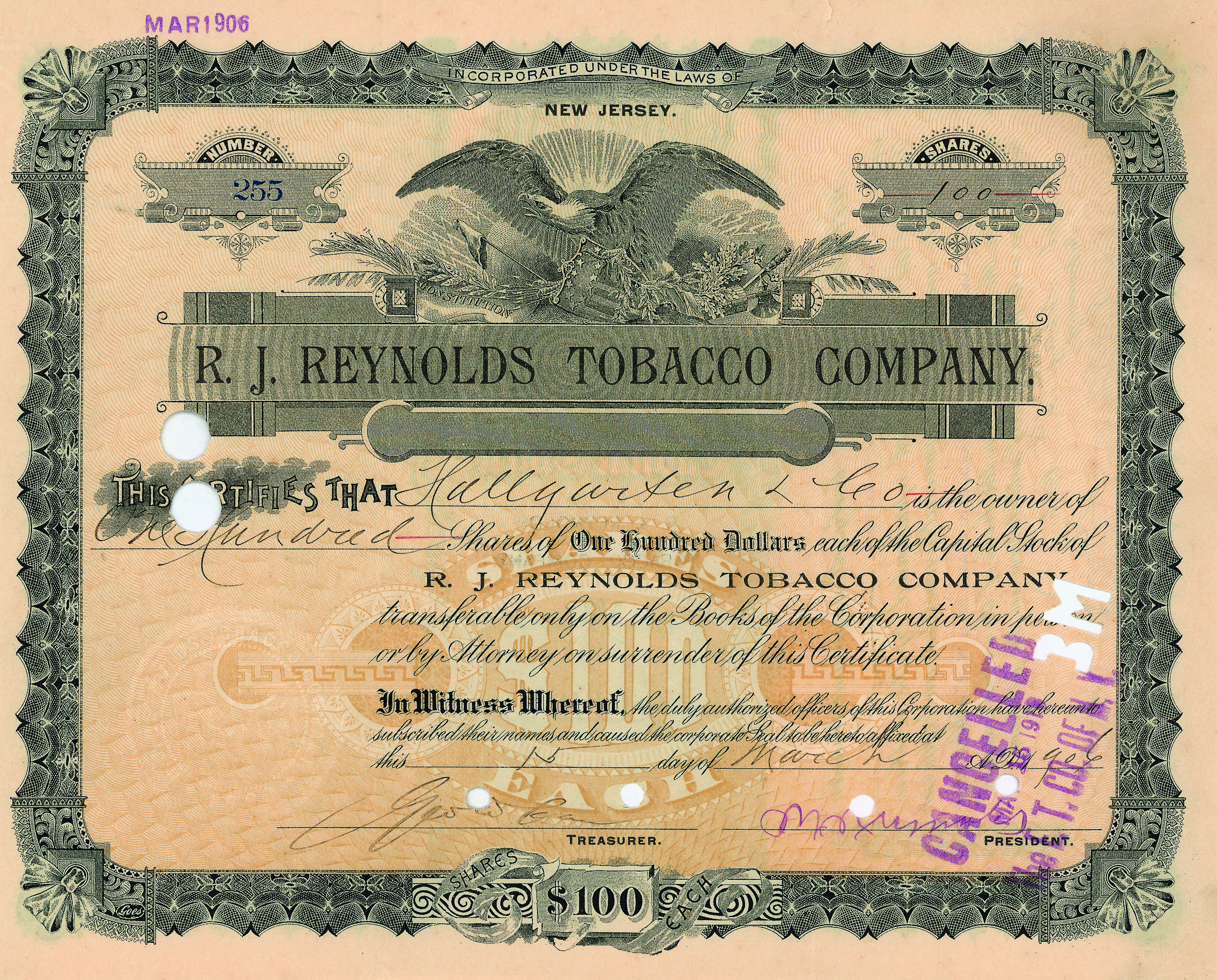
Share of the R. J. Reynolds Tobacco Company, issued March 15, 1906

Reynolds' younger brother, William Neal, was attending Trinity College (now Duke University) and worked part-time for him. Mr. Will, as he was known, began as a leaf-hanger and quickly mastered all facets of the operation. After leaving Trinity College, he managed tobacco purchasing. In 1888, Reynolds formed a formal partnership with Mr. Will and the company bookkeeper, Henry Roan. Reynolds served as President with 75% ownership, and Mr. Will and Henry Roan divided the remainder. The R. J. Reynolds Tobacco Company was chartered as a corporation by the state of North Carolina on February 11, 1890. In 1892, Reynolds' net worth had grown to $200,000.

In 1913, Reynolds developed a great innovation: the packaged cigarette. Most tobacco users who smoked cigarettes preferred to roll their own, and there was thought to be no national market for pre-packaged cigarettes. Reynolds worked to develop a flavor he thought would be more appealing than past products, creating the Camel cigarette, so named because it used Turkish tobacco. Reynolds undercut competitors on the cost of the cigarettes, and within a year, he had sold 425 million packs of Camels.

By the time of his death, Reynolds had become the wealthiest man in North Carolina by far; his $66,000 paid annually in taxes was double the next-highest taxpayer. R. J. Reynolds had grown to encompass 121 buildings in Winston-Salem. After his death in 1918, his brother assumed control of the company; board members would wait 41 years before hanging another portrait beside Reynolds' in the R. J. Reynolds board room.

== Family and personal life ==
There are rumors within both black and white Winston families' oral traditions that Reynolds was the father of numerous illegitimate children. Some of the company brands such as Annie, Lula, and Lottie were purportedly named for Reynolds' girlfriends during his lifetime. Reynolds did in fact have at least one illegitimate child before his marriage late in life, named John Neal (1887-1920). Neal was white and grew up at an orphanage in Oxford, North Carolina. Reynolds had some amount of involvement with Neal, spending time with him and supporting him financially during his life; RJR's extant account books show purchases for clothing and education expenses for Neal. In the 1900 census, RJR's brother and sister-in-law, William Neal and Kate Bitting, are listed as the twelve year-old John Neal's adoptive parents, and he lived with them for an undetermined time after leaving the orphanage. Additionally Neal died of pneumonia in 1920 while living in Omaha, Nebraska and working as division managing salesman for the R. J. Reynolds Tobacco Company. Neal is buried in the William Neal and Kate Bitting plot in Salem Cemetery, Winston-Salem.

Reynolds was the most eligible bachelor for many years in Winston-Salem and married Katharine Smith (November 17, 1880 – May 23, 1923), who was 30 years his junior, on February 27, 1905, in Mount Airy, North Carolina. She was the daughter of Zachary Taylor Smith (February 19, 1847 – June 13, 1938) and Mary Susan Jackson (January 21, 1855 – April 17, 1926).

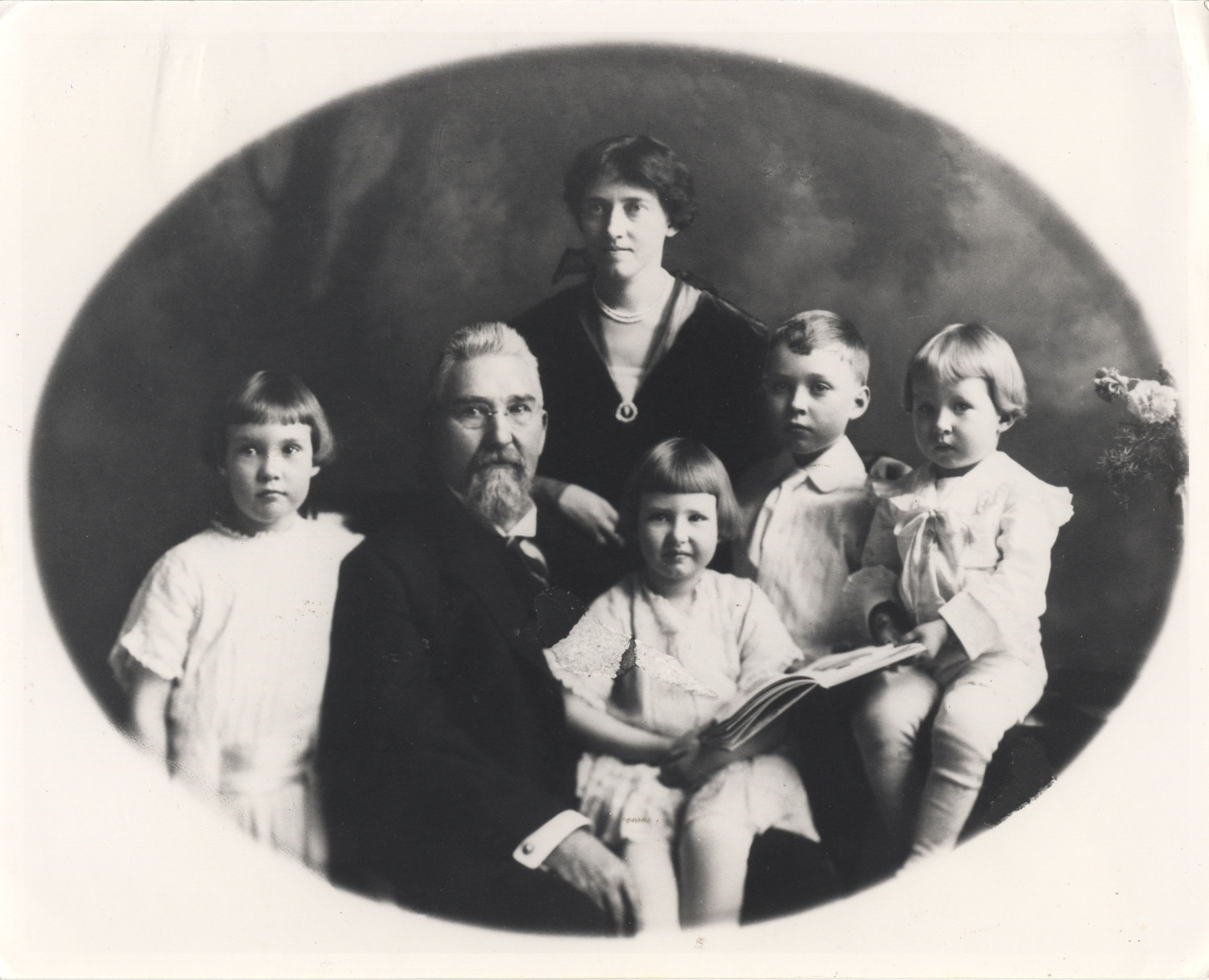
R.J. Reynolds family 1914

Reynolds and Katharine's father, Zachary, were first cousins, and Reynolds had known Katharine since she was a young girl. She earned a degree in English literature and went to work as a Reynolds secretary, at one point winning $1,000 in a company-sponsored contest. Reynolds joked that he married Katharine to get his money back. Their marriage was very happy, and Reynolds wrote to Katharine saying he was very glad he waited so long to marry. Katharine Reynolds urged her husband to shorten employees' work hours and provide a lunchroom, schools and nursery services for them.

The Reynolds' children were:

- Richard Joshua Reynolds, Jr. (April 4, 1906 – December 14, 1964) who married Elizabeth McCaw "Blitz" Dillard (1909 – Dec. 1961), Marianne O'Brien (d. 1985), Muriel Maud Marston Laurence Greenough (December 28, 1915 in Calgary, Alberta, Canada – 1980), and Annemarie Schmitt (b. 1932 – ).

RJ Jr and Blitz had four sons, Richard Joshua "Josh" Reynolds III, John Dillard Reynolds, Zachary Taylor Reynolds, and William Neal Reynolds II. RJ Jr. and Marianne had two sons, Michael Randolph Reynolds (July 13, 1947 – November 3, 2004) and Patrick Reynolds, who publicly took a stand as a tobaccofree advocate (b. December 2, 1948 – ). RJ Jr and Annemarie had one daughter two days after RJ Jr died, Irene Sabine Reynolds (b. December 16, 1964 – )

- Mary Katharine Reynolds (August 8, 1908 – July 17, 1953) who married Charles Henry Babcock (September 22, 1899 – December 13, 1967)
- Nancy Susan Reynolds (February 5, 1910 – January 1985) who married Henry Walker Bagley (August 6, 1900 in Atlanta, Georgia – April 19, 1983) and Gilbert Verney. Nancy and Henry had three daughters, Jane Bagley Lehman (married to Orin Lehman), Susan Bagley Bloom, and Anne Bagley Grant, and one son, Smith Bagley, cell phone business executive and social activist.
- Zachary Smith Reynolds (November 5, 1911 – July 6, 1932) who married Anne Ludlow Cannon (August 31, 1901 – June 21, 1961) in York, South Carolina, November 16, 1929, and Libby Holman in Monroe, Michigan, on Sunday, November 29, 1931.

Reynolds lived above the factory floor for many years. When he married, he lived with his family alongside other R. J. Reynolds executives on Fifth Street in Winston-Salem until 1917, when they moved to Reynolda House, a 1,000-acre (4 km^{2}) estate on the outskirts of town that also housed a village where Reynolds workers could live. The grounds featured a post office, schools, a chapel, a blacksmith shop and a greenhouse. At Reynolda House, Katharine brought farmers together to learn the latest scientific advances in farming. Katharine offered evening literacy classes to workers. She also commissioned construction of a nine-hole golf course.

Reynolds died in 1918, and his wife, although 30 years younger, died six years later. They are buried in Salem Cemetery in Winston-Salem. Their children were then raised by their uncle, Reynolds' brother William Neal Reynolds, and his wife Kate Bitting Reynolds. Dick Reynolds became a Democratic politician, mayor of Winston-Salem, and treasurer of the Democratic National Committee.

Reynolds's grandson, Patrick Reynolds, became an anti-smoking activist following several family deaths from smoking and began the Foundation for a Smoke-Free America.

== Political views ==
In 1884, Reynolds served as a city commissioner in Winston-Salem. Reynolds established progressive working conditions in his factory, with shorter hours and higher pay. He also signed a petition for a property tax to pay for public schools and voted to approve an income tax.

== Lasting influence of Reynolds and his family ==
Reynolds was generous with his workers, building schools and houses for them on his property. He also granted endowments to Guilford College, the Oxford Orphan Asylum, and the Baptist Orphanage, in addition to many other charities and churches in the Winston-Salem community. He became the first Southern man to establish a hospital serving African Americans in the South, the Slater Hospital. He started a savings and loan, served on the town board of Winston-Salem, and began a YMCA and an opera house.

Reynolds donated money to the establishment of the Slater Industrial School, which would later become Winston-Salem State University.

In 1923, the newly formed Reynolds Foundation fully financed the construction of Nancy Reynolds Memorial School built at the birthplace of his and Will Reynolds' mother, Nancy Jane Cox Reynolds, in the Brown Mountain community of Stokes County. In 1930, the Reynolds Foundation paid for the construction of two wings adjoining the original building. During the Depression, Will Reynolds covered the costs for an additional month of school in order for Nancy Reynolds to become accredited. In the 1950s, the foundation financed and built the school's freestanding gymnasium and built and equipped its large agricultural building. A memorial gift that still provides for the school today is a $25,000 endowment set up after the death of Kate Bitting Reynolds, Will's wife, with the yearly dividends to be used solely for the upkeep of grounds, exterior beautification projects and playground equipment. The endowment's total value is now more than three-quarters of a million dollars and easily supports its intended use.

When Reynolds died, North Carolina's governor Thomas Walter Bickett said: "Therefore, the greatest eulogy that can be offered would be to refer to his life of rugged honesty, his wide usefulness and his kindly dealings with his fellowmen, which he himself deemed his first duty."

=== Katharine Reynolds' philanthropy ===
R. J. Reynolds and his family played a large part in the public life and history of the city of Winston-Salem. After his death, his widow Katharine Smith Reynolds continued his philanthropic activities. She contributed land and funds to establish The Richard J. Reynolds High School and the R. J. Reynolds Memorial Auditorium (both listed in the National Register of Historic Places). Construction of the school and auditorium began in 1919 under the direction of architect Charles Barton Keen, and finished in 1924. Another memorial to Reynolds, an equine statue, sits on Winston-Salem City Hall Grounds in downtown Winston-Salem. A memorial to Katharine Reynolds, a 20-foot-tall obelisk, now sits on the grounds of the Richard J. Reynolds High School and R.J. Reynolds Memorial Auditorium (it was originally placed on a site in Reynolda Village, around Reynolda Church, but was rescued from demolition and moved to the site on the school grounds).

=== Children's philanthropy ===
The Reynolds' estate, Reynolda House, was completed just prior to Reynolds' death in 1918 and was later donated by his daughter, Mary Reynolds Babcock, for use as an art museum. At the age of 28, Mary inherited $30 million and became one of the world's richest women. She contributed to the William Neal Reynolds Coliseum in Raleigh, North Carolina, in honor of her uncle. Her will gave $525,000 for a dormitory at Salem College in Winston-Salem.

The Z. Smith Reynolds Foundation was formed by Mary Reynolds Babcock and her siblings to honor their brother, Reynolds' son Zachary, whose mysterious death at the age of 20 at Reynolda is still disputed to this day as murder or suicide. The Z. Smith Reynolds Foundation to this day gives away millions annually in the Piedmont Triad region. Babcock and her husband Charles also donated land and funds to start a country club from the grounds of Reynolda in 1939, allowing members to sign up for $1 a year while she was alive.

An area of 350 acres (1.4 km^{2}) of the grounds of the Reynolds estate was donated to Wake Forest University, which then relocated from Wake Forest, North Carolina, to Winston-Salem in 1956 and was given $350,000 annually from the Z. Smith Reynolds Foundation in exchange for the move. The Reynolds family is honored through many names on the Wake Forest campus, including Reynolda Hall; the university's library, the Z. Smith Reynolds Library; William Neal Reynolds Gymnasium; along with a dormitory named for Mary Reynolds Babcock. Her husband, Charles Babcock, is honored by Wake Forest through the Charles Babcock School of Business Administration. The school was begun through $500,000 each in gifts from the Z. Smith Reynolds Foundation and Nancy Susan Reynolds. Winston-Salem's airport, the Smith Reynolds Airport, is named for Zachary Smith Reynolds.

Reynolds' older son, Dick, also donated acres of land and funds to the county for the establishment of a golf course and public park in 1939, called Reynolds Park. Its opening in 1940 marked the first time that the Winston-Salem public had access to swimming pools, tennis courts, and a golf course—previously, one had to be a member of a private club to use these types of facilities.

Almost a century after her father founded the R. J. Reynolds Tobacco Company, Nancy Susan Reynolds Bagley Verney, his youngest daughter and last surviving child, decided to give back to the region of her father's boyhood. In 1969, she deeded Virginia Tech 710 acres (2.9 km^{2}) of Rock Spring Plantation. In 1980, she deeded them another 7 acres (28,000 m^{2}), where Reynolds' childhood home and a continuing education center stand. She created an endowment of $1.7 million to provide cultural programming to the surrounding community, to run a forestry research center on the site, and to fund a scholarship program for Patrick County high school students. She financed this in part by selling her Quarry Farm, designed by architect Frank Forster, in Greenwich, Connecticut, to actor Frank Gorshin in 1977 for $650,000 He would later sell it in 1980 to Diana Ross formerly of the Supremes. She also headed the effort to turn the Virginia farmstead where her father was raised into a historic site. Now called the Reynolds Homestead, it is a State and National Historic Landmark listed in the National Register of Historic Places. As a Continuing Education Center of Virginia Tech, it offers a variety of programs and classes for all ages, all open to the public and many for free. It is open for tours, April through October, Monday through Saturday.

=== Family's companies ===
Descendants of Hardin William Reynolds have influenced the economic and cultural growth of the U.S., particularly in the South, through their business successes and philanthropy.

In 1919, his nephew, Richard S. Reynolds Sr., founded the U.S. Foil Company in Louisville, Kentucky, supplying tin-lead wrappers to cigarette and candy companies. In 1924, he bought the maker of Eskimo Pies (which were foil-wrapped) and four years later he purchased Robertshaw Thermostat, Fulton Sylphon, and part of Beechnut Foil, adding the companies to U.S. Foil to form Reynolds Metals. After realizing the limitations of the tin and lead used in his company's products, in 1926 he added aluminum to the line. The company began using aluminum foil as a packaging material in 1926, and in 1947 they introduced Reynolds Wrap. Sold worldwide, it transformed food storage. Reynolds Metals was the second-largest aluminum company in the United States and the third-largest in the world. The Richmond, Virginia-based company was acquired by Alcoa in 2000.

== See also ==
- Arca Foundation
