= Z. Smith Reynolds Library =

Primary building of the library system of Wake Forest University

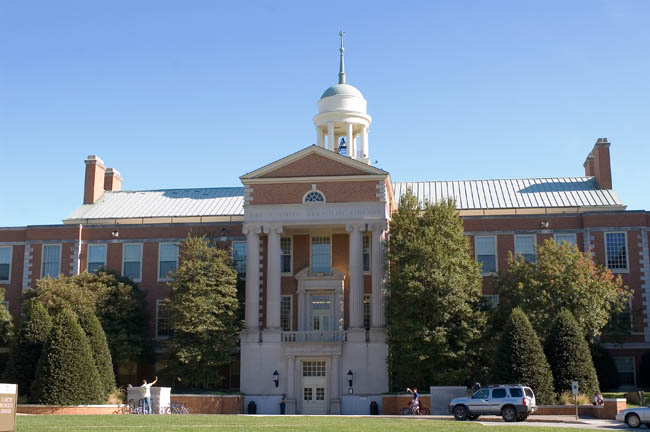
- The library in 2006
- 36.1318°N 80.2779°W
- Location: 2100 Eure Drive, Winston-Salem, North Carolina, U.S., United States
- Type: Academic
- Established: 1956 (70 years ago)
- Branch of: Wake Forest University

Access and use
- Access requirements: Wake Forest University faculty, students and staff
- Circulation: 100,000 items per year

Other information
- Employees: 62
- Website: Z. Smith Reynolds Library

The Z. Smith Reynolds Library (also known as ZSR Library) is the main library of Wake Forest University in Winston-Salem, North Carolina. An eight-story building, it is located on the university's main (Reynolda) campus, a short distance south of the T. K. Hearn Plaza (the quad). The library opened in 1956. The four-story Wilson Wing was added in 1991.

The building is named for Zachary Smith Reynolds (1911–1932), the son of R. J. Reynolds, a prominent businessman in Winston-Salem.

The library is open to students and faculty in the Undergraduate College, the Wake Forest School of Business, the Graduate School of Arts and Sciences, and the Wake Forest Divinity School.

Its 173,000 square feet (16,100 m^{2}) contains over 1.2 million volumes, while its circulation is over 100,000 per year.

A coffeehouse in the library is run by Camino Bakery.
