= Salem Cemetery (Winston-Salem, North Carolina) =

Historic cemetery in Forsyth County, North Carolina

Coordinates: 36°05′29″N 80°14′20″W

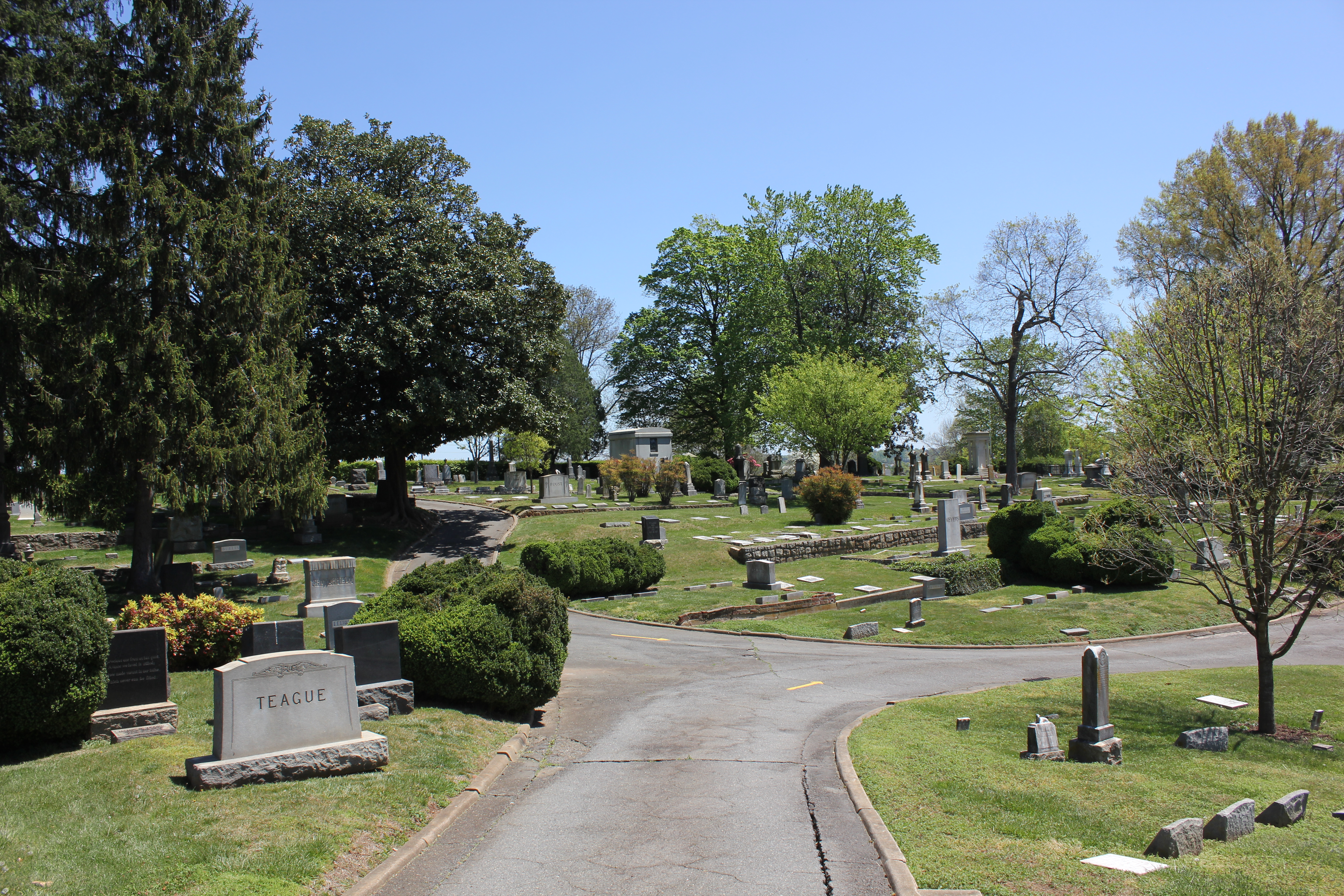
- Salem Cemetery
- Interactive map of Salem Cemetery

Details
- Location: 301 Cemetery St., Winston-Salem, North Carolina

The Salem Cemetery is located at 301 Cemetery St. in Winston-Salem, North Carolina. It is adjacent to the older God's Acre Cemetery of the Moravian Church.

== Notable burials ==
- William Robertson Boggs (1829–1911), Confederate Army General
- Richard Thurmond Chatham (1896–1957), businessman, politician
- Thomas Henry Davis (1918–1999), aviator, founder of Piedmont Airlines
- Cornelia Deaderick Glenn (1854–1926), First Lady of North Carolina
- Robert Broadnax Glenn (1854–1920), Governor of North Carolina
- Margaret Nowell Graham (1867–1942), artist
- Gordon Gray (1909–1982), American politician, U.S National Security Advisor
- John Wesley Hanes (1850–1903), businessman
- Rufus Lenoir Patterson (1830–1879), businessman, politician
- Richard Joshua Reynolds (1850–1918), founder of R.J. Reynolds Tobacco Company
- Zachary Smith Reynolds (1911–1932), aviator
- Augustine Henry Shepperd (1792–1864), politician
- Florence Wells Slater (1864–1941), scientist and teacher
