= Zachary Smith Reynolds =

American aviator (1911–1932)

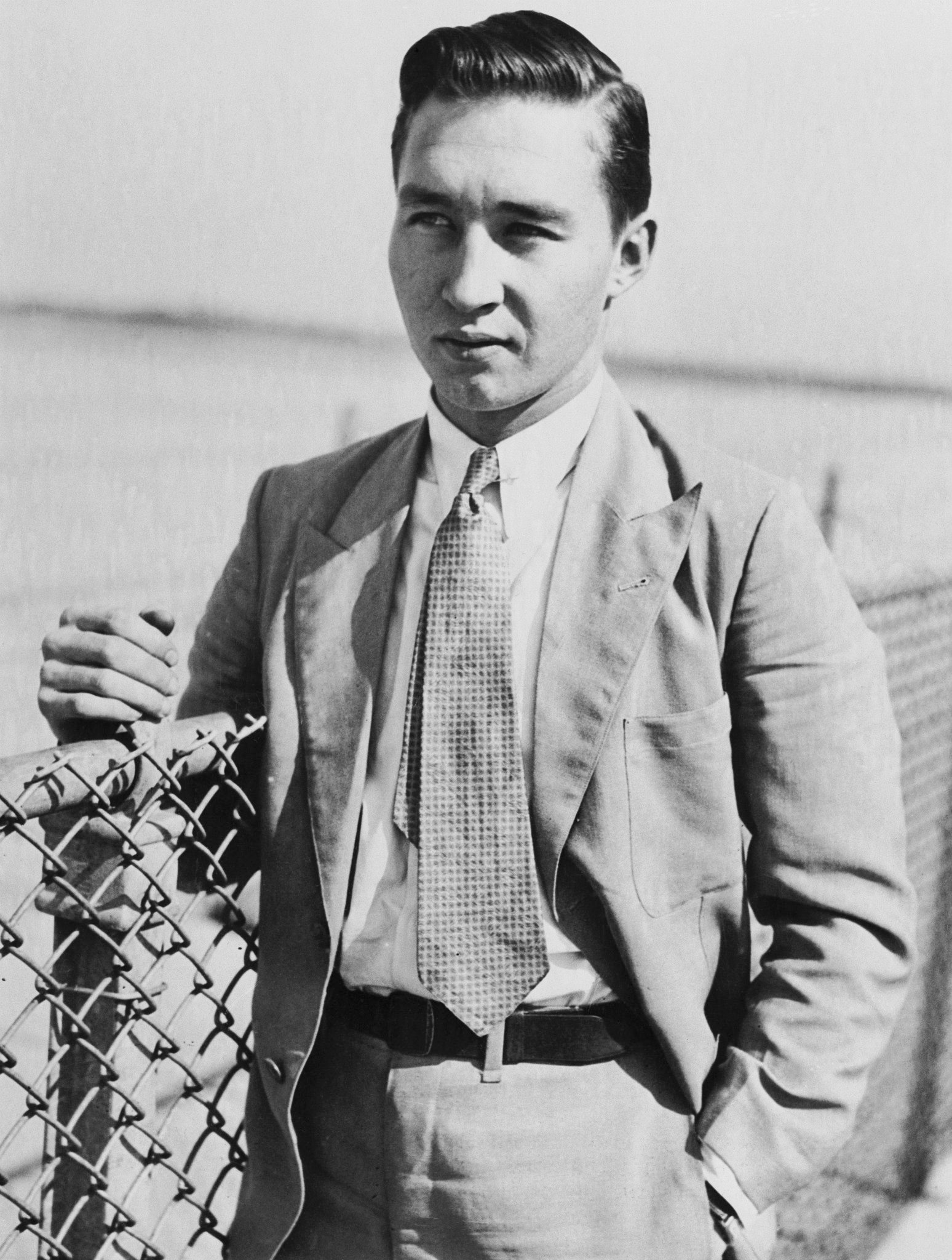
- Reynolds in 1931
- Born: November 5, 1911; Winston-Salem, North Carolina, U.S.
- Died: July 6, 1932 (aged 20); Reynolda House, Winston-Salem, North Carolina, U.S.
- Other name: Z. Smith Reynolds
- Education: Richard J. Reynolds High School; Woodberry Forest School
- Spouses: Anne Ludlow Cannon (m. 1929; div. 1931) Libby Holman (m. 1931)
- Children: 2; including Anne Cannon Forsyth
- Parents: R. J. Reynolds (father); Katharine Smith Reynolds (mother)
- Relatives: R. J. Reynolds Jr. (brother); Mary Reynolds Babcock (sister); William Neal Reynolds (uncle)

Zachary Smith Reynolds (November 5, 1911 – July 6, 1932) was an American amateur aviator and youngest son of millionaire businessman R. J. Reynolds. The scion of one of the richest men in the United States at the time, Reynolds was to inherit US$20 million when he turned 28 (equivalent to US$470 million in 2025), as established in his father's will.

During the early morning hours of July 6, 1932, Reynolds died of a gunshot wound to the head following a party on the Reynolds family estate. A series of investigations revealed inconsistent testimony from the partygoers and signs of tampering with the crime scene. The death gained sensational media coverage after Reynolds' wife of a few months, Broadway performer Libby Holman, along with Reynolds' friend, Albert "Ab" Walker, were indicted for first-degree murder. The case was eventually dropped due to lack of evidence and at the request of the Reynolds family. Reynolds' death remains unsolved; based on the evidence and testimonies, it is unknown if it was a murder or a suicide.

Multiple films were inspired by the case, including the melodrama film Written on the Wind (1956). Reynolds' siblings donated their shares of his estate to form the Z. Smith Reynolds Foundation for the benefit of social causes in North Carolina.

== Early life ==
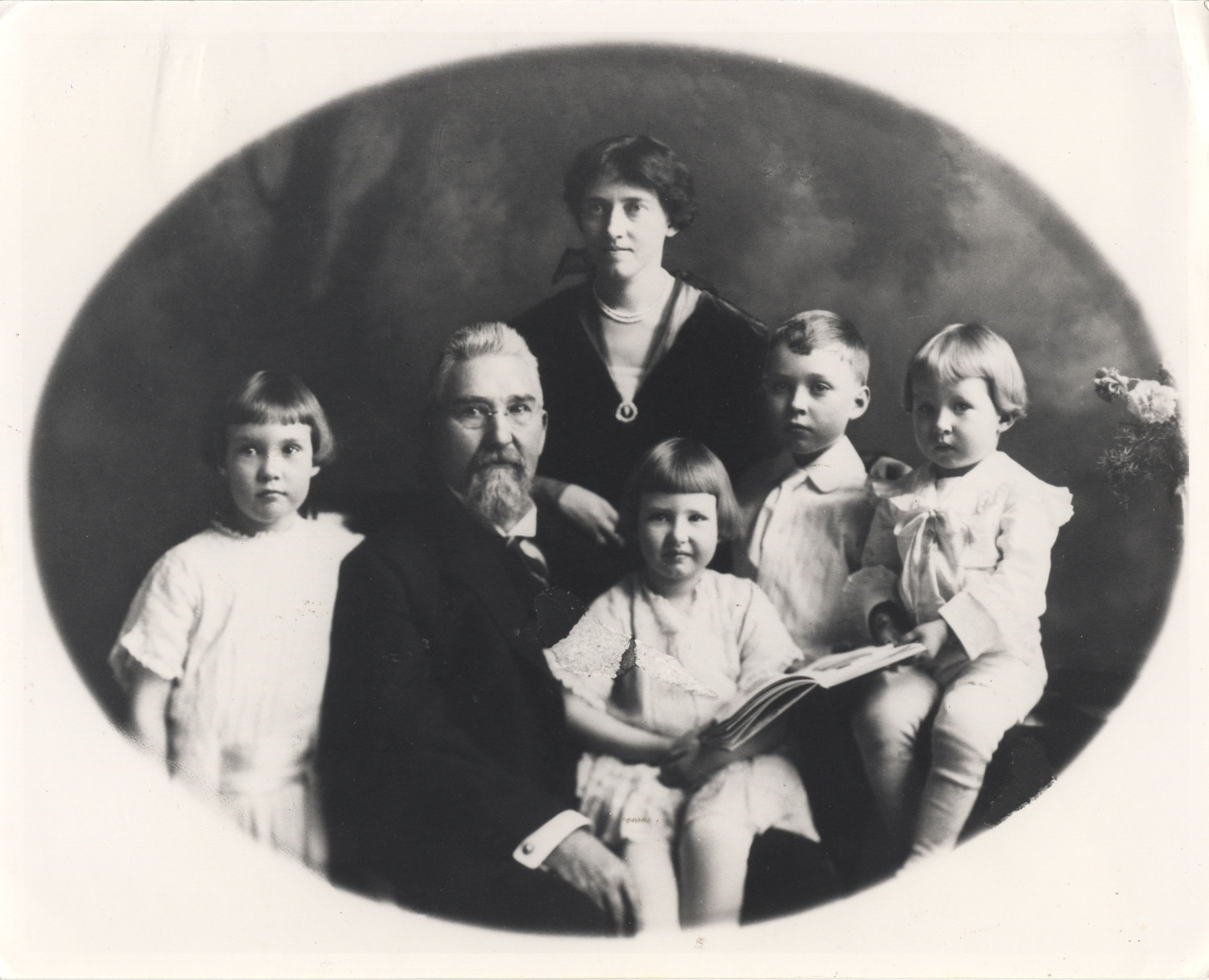
R.J. Reynolds 1914 family photo. From left to right: Mary, R.J. Reynolds, Katharine Reynolds, Nancy, Richard Joshua "Dick", Zachary Smith

Zachary Smith Reynolds—also known as Z. Smith Reynolds or just Smith Reynolds—was born in Winston-Salem, North Carolina, on November 5, 1911. Smith was the son of R. J. Reynolds, founder of the R. J. Reynolds Tobacco Company (RJR), and Katharine Smith Reynolds. He was the youngest of four children and was close with his siblings. His sister Nancy remembered him fondly in a 1980 interview: "Smith was my friend. I mean, he was younger than I, but you never felt that way about him because he was so intelligent, and he was so adult in his thinking... He was a very strong character, Smith was."

At the time of Smith's birth in 1911, his father was the wealthiest man in the state of North Carolina, and RJR was producing one-fourth of all plug chewing tobacco in the United States. The introduction of the Camel cigarette brand two years later spiked the company's profits. In its first year of production, 425 billion Camel cigarettes were sold, becoming the most popular brand in the U.S. by 1918.

=== Reynolda Estate ===
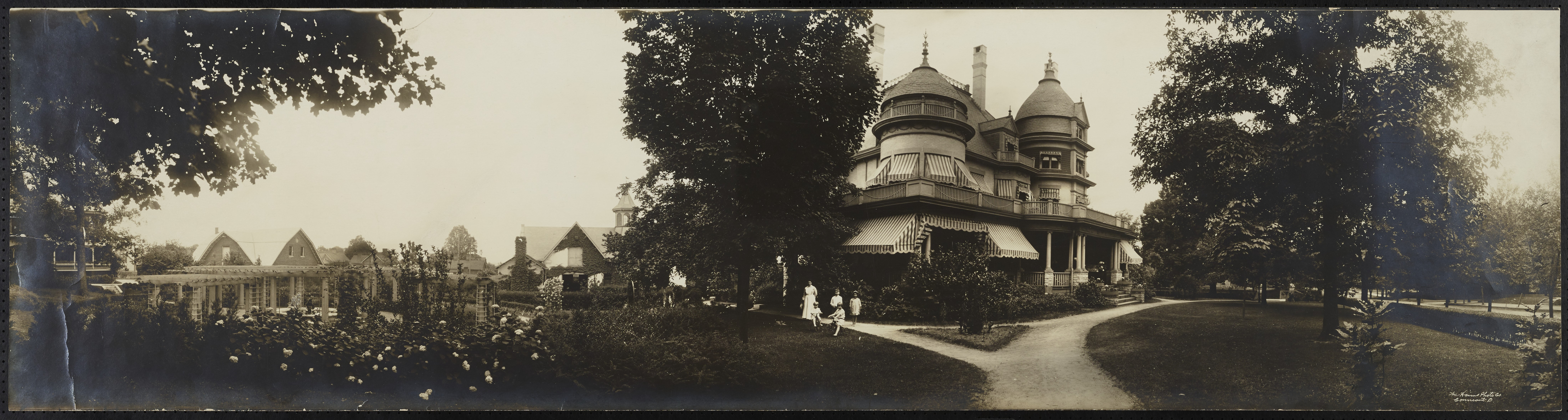
Reynolds children and unknown adult in front of the original Victorian Reynolds family mansion on "Millionaire's Row" in Winston-Salem, site of the present-day Forsyth Central Library.

The Reynolds family initially lived in a Queen Anne-style Victorian mansion at 666 West Fifth Street in Winston-Salem, in a neighborhood known as "Millionaire's Row," alongside other members of the family as well as important RJR executives. While living at the mansion, Smith's mother began to design a country estate, the future Reynolda House. Agriculture and country living were very stylish among wealthy Americans during this period; Mrs. Reynolds herself was subscribed to fashionable publications such as Town and Country, Women's Home Companion and Country Life in America.

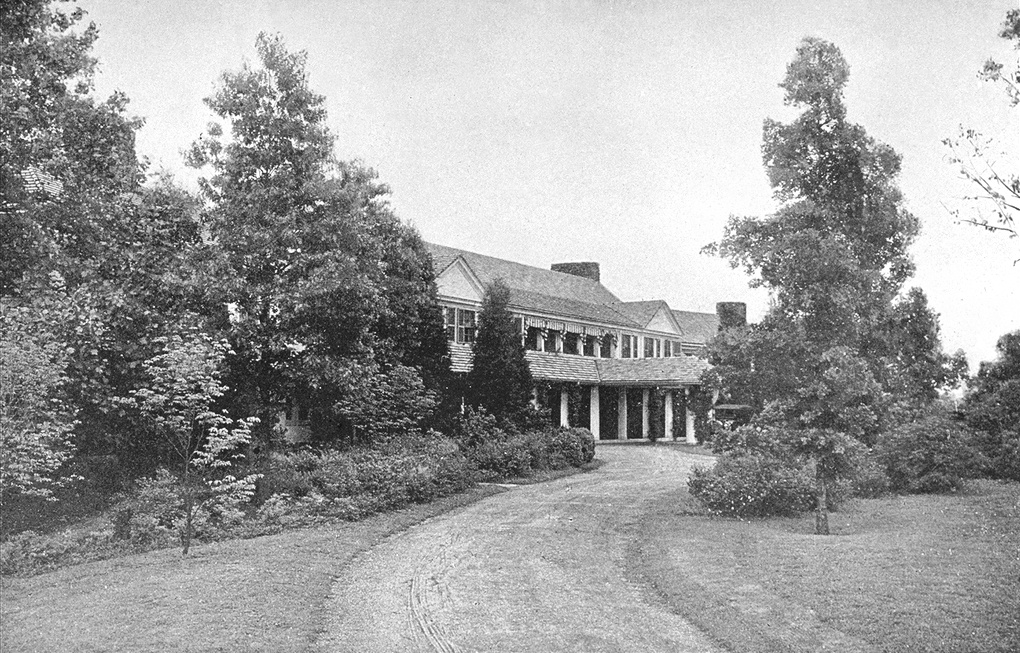
The Reynolda House, ca. 1915

The 1,067-acre estate would be completed in winter of 1917. Its centerpiece was a 64-room mansion, described modestly as a "bungalow" by Smith's parents. The house was four stories tall and divided into a central section with two wings, each attached to the main house at a 20-degree angle. The design and construction of the house took a total of five years: its layout and utilities became complex to meet the needs of the family. The final plan included two kitchens, three dumbwaiters, an elevator, fourteen bathrooms, a telephone in each room and an Aeolian Company pipe organ featuring four keyboards and a pedal footboard. The rugs, curtains and other furnishings were designed and placed to absorb its harsh tones and create a warmer sound. The relatively simple exterior of the "bungalow" betrayed the luxurious interior: the main rooms—central living room, reception hall and dining room—were decorated with detailed paneling, carved moldings and rosettes, including Corinthian, Doric and Ionic columns, and each public room had a fireplace with a carved-marble mantelpiece.

The main house was complemented by formal gardens, vineyards, a golf course, two tennis courts, an outdoor swimming pool and a man-made lake with a boathouse, called "Lake Katharine." The lake was created by damming the nearby Silas Creek. Its depth was regulated by a spillway that led into an artificial pool with a concrete bottom. Occasionally the lake would be emptied for cleaning by sweeping out the bottom and sides. Adjoining the property was the so-called "Reynolda Village," which was primarily used for housing the estate's staff. The village had its own post office, two churches, two schools and a model farm to exhibit and innovate the latest practices in agriculture, horticulture and livestock production.

The building of the Reynolda estate coincided with the growing wealth of the Reynolds family: RJR experienced a sharp increase in profit after the introduction of the Camel brand, with net profits jumping from US$2.9 million in 1912 to $23.8 million in 1924. In 1922, The Wall Street Journal reported that RJR's net earnings were the highest ever posted by a tobacco manufacturer in history.

=== 1918-1924 ===
The Reynolds family permanently moved into Reynolda in December 1917. However, R. J. Reynolds had been experiencing illness due to pancreatic cancer earlier in the year. Treatments of the period, including quarantine and the pulling of all his teeth, were unsuccessful. By early 1918, Reynolds was increasingly in pain and bedridden. After a major surgery in Philadelphia, he was brought back to Reynolda and died there on July 29, 1918. Reynolds had written a will beforehand that left each of his four children a trust that they had limited access to until they reached the age of 28.

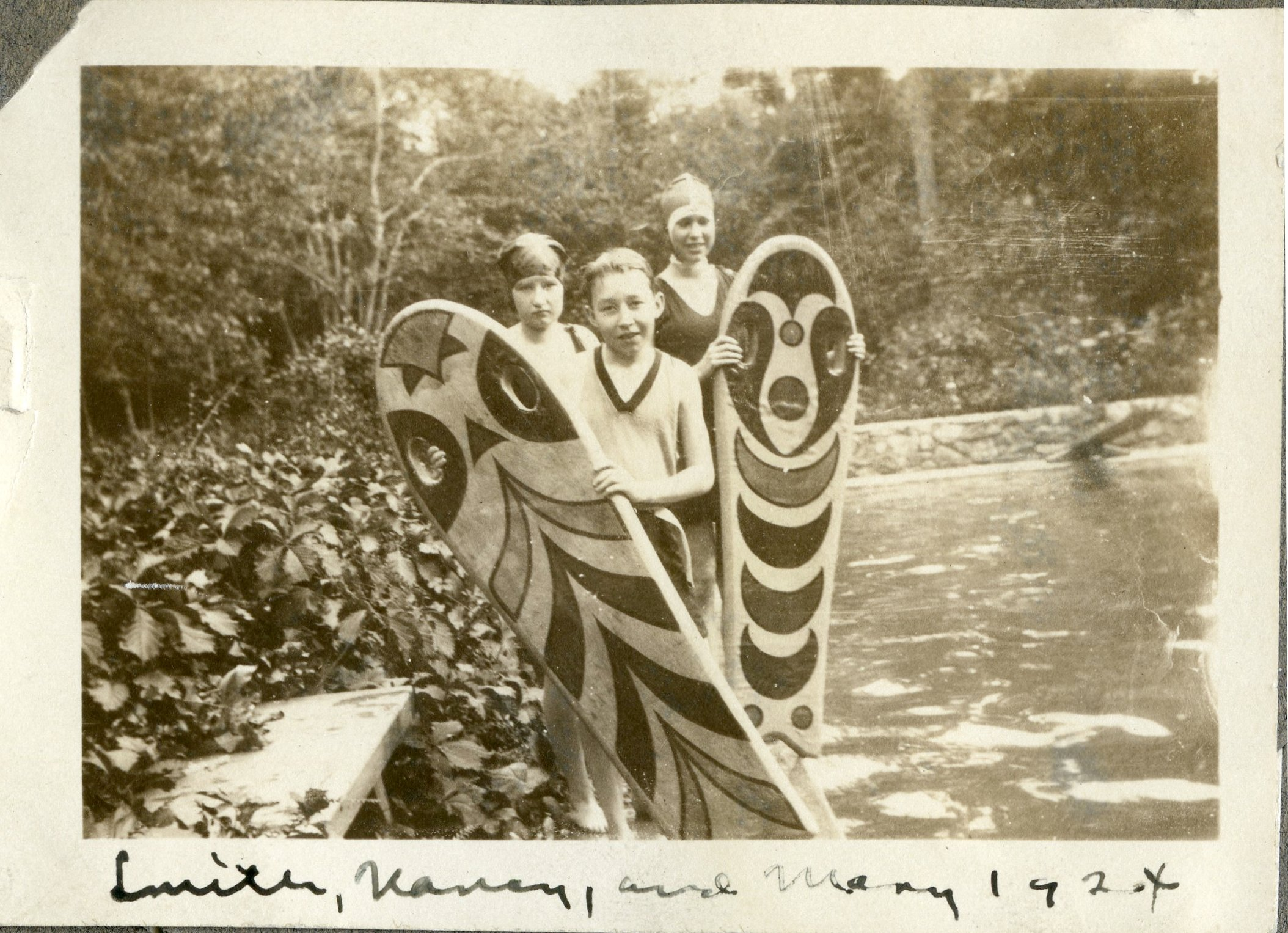
Zachary Smith Reynolds with his sisters Nancy and Mary in 1924, at the Reynolda estate outdoor pool

Since its opening, the three youngest children attended the school built for the estate. A year after Reynolds' death, Katharine began courting John Edward Johnston, the school's headmaster, who was about twenty years her junior. On June 11, 1921, Katharine and Johnston married in the living room of the Reynolda House. After honeymooning in Europe, the couple moved to a smaller cabin on the estate, leaving the children in the main bungalow with their governess and other retainers. In early 1924, against doctor's recommendations, Katharine became pregnant at age 44. The pregnancy was difficult, and the couple moved to New York City to have better access to doctors. On May 21, Katharine gave birth to J. Edward Johnston Jr.; however, three days later, she died from complications of the birth when a blood clot traveled to her brain and triggered an embolism.

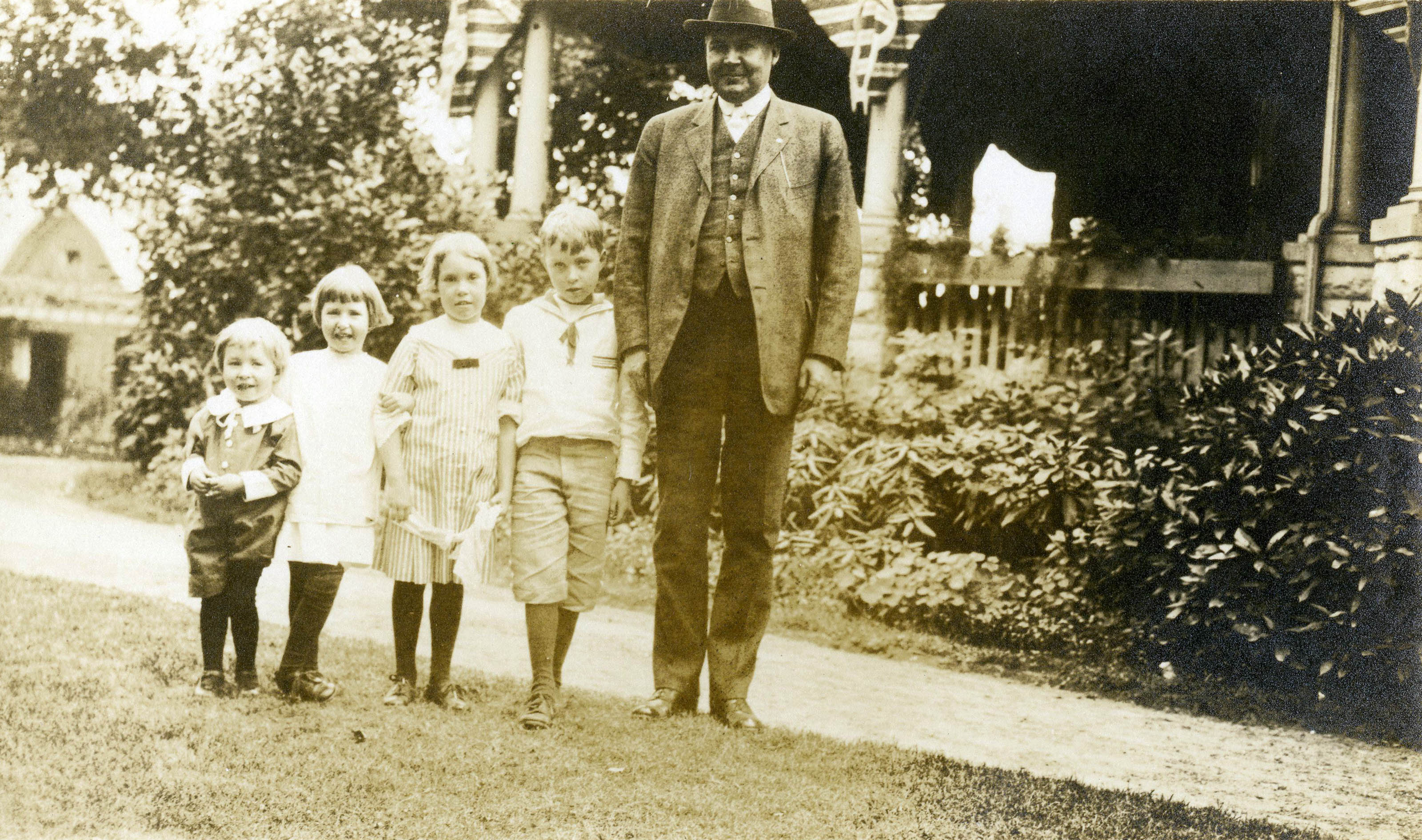
William Neal Reynolds with his nieces and nephews (right to left) Dick, Mary, Nancy, and Smith in 1914

After Katharine's death, the responsibility of the children's care fell to Johnston and their uncle, William Neal Reynolds. That summer, the two men sent the children on a summer tour of Europe and South America, being something which had already been previously planned by Katharine. Upon returning in the fall, they were each sent to their respective boarding schools, Smith going to Woodberry Forest where his older brother R. J. "Dick" Reynolds, Jr., had previously attended.

=== Education ===
Smith spent two years at Woodberry dabbling in various clubs, including the Smokers Club, where he was known as "Camel" Reynolds. While at Woodberry he wrote at least two suicide notes: the notes would be taken out from his papers after his death and shown during the inquest. One note was written as a last will and reads: "LAST WILL. I will my car to Ab [Walker, his best friend], if he finishes it. My money to Dick. My reputation to Virginia. My good looks to Mary (she needs it.) P.S. You think I am tite [drunk], but I'm not. P.S. Hope you don't feel hurt about this will." The second was written in a scribble on the back of a statement from Finchley, Clothes & Haberdashery, dated June 1927: "My girl has turned me down. Good-bye forever. Give my love to Mary, Virginia, Nancy, Dick, etc. Good-bye cruel world — Smith."

Smith's brother Dick dropped out of North Carolina State College of Agriculture and Engineering after two semesters to move to New York City. By this time Smith had switched schools to R. J. Reynolds High School; following lack of success, he followed his brother's lead, dropping out at age 15 to join Dick and work for the newly founded Reynolds Aviation.

== Aviation ==
Smith and his brother Dick were both avid sports aviators. Following the success of Charles Lindbergh's transatlantic flight in 1927, Dick took on aviation as a business venture, buying the historic Roosevelt Field, along with the nearby Curtiss and Mitchell fields, and founded airlines Reynolds Aviation and Camel City Flying Service. Unofficial family historian W. Noah Reynolds felt that Smith's interest in aviation came from Dick, as "Smith looked up to his older brother and wanted to do what his older brother did." Nancy thought both her brothers "had mechanical, mathematical type of minds." In summer 1926, Smith took his first flying lessons from Lewis S. "Mac" McGinnis, a flying instructor for Curtiss Flying School. The Reynolds brothers would practice takeoffs and landings on the 3/4-mile (1.2 km) front lawn of the Reynolda bungalow and perform tricks in the air to terrify their sisters Nancy and Mary.

Smith eventually dropped out of school to work for Reynolds Aviation and grow as an independent aviator. A classmate at R. J. Reynolds High School, Egbert Davis Jr., recalled that Smith was not interested when Davis invited him to join the local Hi-Y YMCA club: "Smith wanted to spend all his spare time flying." Attesting to his passion, Smith's financial records from 1928 show expenses for a new Waco 10 biplane, pilot's insurance, aviation club memberships, aviation magazines, parachutes and other items. Nancy recalled that Smith and Mary would regularly "[get] a lot of practice barnstorming...They'd go around and have these shows in some farmer's field that he'd mowed up for them." In addition, Smith participated in the local Winston-Salem aviation community: in September 1928, he won an amateur race at the dedication of Winston-Salem's new airport, Miller Field.

On August 1, 1928, at age 16, Smith earned a private pilot's license, attested to by the Fédération Aéronautique Internationale and personally signed by Orville Wright. In May 1929 he obtained both his transport pilot's license and mechanic's license; at age 17 he was the youngest person in the country to hold a transport pilot's license. Smith became something of a local hero in Winston-Salem, and was one of North Carolina's most notable sports aviators during the Golden Age of Aviation.

=== 1931 journey ===
Smith's biggest achievement as an aviator was the longest point-to-point solo circumnavigation at the time, at 17,000 miles over land, lasting from December 1931 to April 1932. The journey began in London and ended in Hong Kong; in between, flying over territories including the Mediterranean, North Africa, the Syrian Desert and India.

Smith began preparing for the flight in spring of 1931, buying a Savoia-Marchetti S.56 biplane built by American Aeronautical Corporation in Port Washington, New York. The aircraft was specially customized to have a single seat and extra fuel capacity for 1,000 miles cruising range. After purchasing the plane, Smith met with a childhood friend, Robert "Slick" Shepherd, a reporter for the Winston-Salem Journal. The two men created a business arrangement in which Shepherd would ghostwrite Smith's story of the flight and syndicate it through a national press agency. Smith requested it to be made to sound exciting and unforgettable, in the spirit of other famous aviation exploits of the day. In return, Shepherd would receive half of the selling price for the story. The journey was delayed by several false starts due to negotiations for flying permits, multiple bouts of illness, and mechanical troubles.

Smith kept a handwritten flight log, "Log of Aeroplane NR-898W," documenting his impressions and flight data during the journey, to be referenced for future publication by Shepherd. The log reveals the challenging and often dangerous nature of the trip. The plane went through near constant mechanical problems, leading to numerous forced landings. Smith often had to fix his own equipment, usually completely alone and in a remote area; he records becoming nearly stranded multiple times. Flying over poorly charted land, he often navigated only by following railroads, rivers, coastlines or landmarks seen on a road map, as seen in an example from the log:

So after some time getting the motor started, I took off for Rome. I again took a route by way of Genoa and then followed the coast. Until now the weather had been clear, but about 25 miles South of Genoa it began to get cloudy and hazy. In a few minutes I was skimming the top of the water and had a visibility of about 25 yards. There was only one thing to do,— climb through the fog to the top of it. I felt somewhat relieved when, at 2000 feet, I saw the sun. For a few minutes I had been in a rather ticklish position with mountains all around me, to say nothing of boats. The top of the fog was like the top of a table. You could see for miles with an occasional mountain peak coming up above it. This at least told me to a certain extent where land was. (The islands are also mountainous and would come above the fog.) I flew for 1 1/2 hours with never a break in the table top. Just as I was about to give up hope, the stuff cleared off and I was just a couple of miles inland from a perfectly clear coast. I had been a bit worried because my throttle was loose and the motor also seemed to be burning too much gasoline...

Smith's flight was not recorded in popular aviation history. He was unable to complete the last 270 miles of the route by plane: when flying over China between Haiphong to Chanchiang, the plane almost ditched. Smith was forced to lighten the load by throwing supplies overboard in order to take off again. Landing in Chanchiang revealed engine damage that would prevent the plane from operating without extensive repairs; as such, Smith made it to Hong Kong by catching a ride on an oil ship. He then cancelled the planned publication of the journey, abandoning the flight log and rescinding the previous offer to Shepherd. Upon returning to the U.S., Smith settled with his new wife at Reynolda for the remaining summer. He enrolled in New York University's aeronautical engineering program for the fall of 1932 and hired on a graduate student to tutor him in mathematics in the interim. Smith would die before ever entering into the program.

After Smith's death, his sister Nancy had the flight log privately published to honor his memory. The thirty-one original copies were distributed among family and friends. The pages of the original log have been scanned and digitized for the Southwest Virginia Digital Archive of Virginia Tech. Reprinted copies of the log are sold at the Reynolda House museum gift shop.

The biplane used in the flight was eventually shipped from Hong Kong to Seattle, Washington. It was sold by Smith's estate on August 4, 1933; six years later it was destroyed during a hangar fire while being stored in Salem, Oregon. A Savoia-Marchetti S.56C aircraft, like the one used by Smith in 1931, is on display at the Carolinas Aviation Museum in Charlotte, North Carolina. The aircraft is on long-term loan from the Reynolda House Museum in Winston-Salem.

== Personal life ==
In the summer of 1929, Smith began courting Anne Ludlow Cannon, the granddaughter of industrialist James William Cannon and an heiress of the Cannon Mills textile fortune. He often flew to Concord, North Carolina, in order to take her on rides in his plane. Anne's father, Joe F. Cannon, insisted that the couple be married. In the early morning of November 16, 1929, he had the couple and himself chauffeured to York, South Carolina, arriving around 2:00 a.m., to be married in a shotgun wedding.

The marriage quickly deteriorated; at the annual society Christmas party at the Robert E. Lee Hotel in Winston-Salem, Smith and Anne got into a fight. Afterward, the pair returned to their apartments at the Carolina Hotel to host a dinner, still incensed. In the presence of Smith's friends, the fight escalated to the point where Smith twice slapped Anne and sent her to bed. Afterwards, he sat at an open window and sullenly threw dinner plates at the streetcar tracks nine stories below. In her 1980 interview, Smith's sister Nancy recalled: "I know he had a very bad temper. Really, when he got angry, he was really angry."

By early 1930, despite Anne being pregnant, the pair had effectively separated. In August 1930 she gave birth to a daughter, Anne Cannon Forsyth, who was sent to live with her grandparents in Blowing Rock, North Carolina.

About a month into the marriage, Smith's friend Dwight Deere Wiman, heir to the John Deere tractor fortune, visited Winston-Salem. Wiman was the producer of a hit Broadway musical, The Little Show. In April 1930, Smith went to see Wiman's touring company of The Little Show in Baltimore and was dazzled by star Libby Holman and her performance, including her signature song "Moanin' Low". After being introduced, Smith followed up with flowers and notes.

Holman would spend the summer of 1930 in Florida with friends; Smith followed her down in his plane, becoming part of her entourage. She would later claim that "Smith asked me to marry him that first summer, almost right after he had met me...I said no, I didn't think I should marry him because he was so young. And, of course, he hadn't his divorce yet and was still married. I told him I thought he had better wait a while. Besides, I was in the theater and didn't think it was fair to marry while still in the theater. He first agreed to that, to wait five years. Then he came to see me and said, 'You go on in the theater, Libby. I need you now. I never had any love in my life and I want someone like you, and as soon as I get my divorce I want you to marry me. I have been alone all my life.'" Holman's friends disliked Smith's brooding attitude but tolerated him as he paid for visits to nightclubs, speakeasies and mixings with New York's elite. His constant presence led to Clifton Webb calling him Holman's personal mascot: "Smitty, the traveling bear."

=== Libby Holman ===
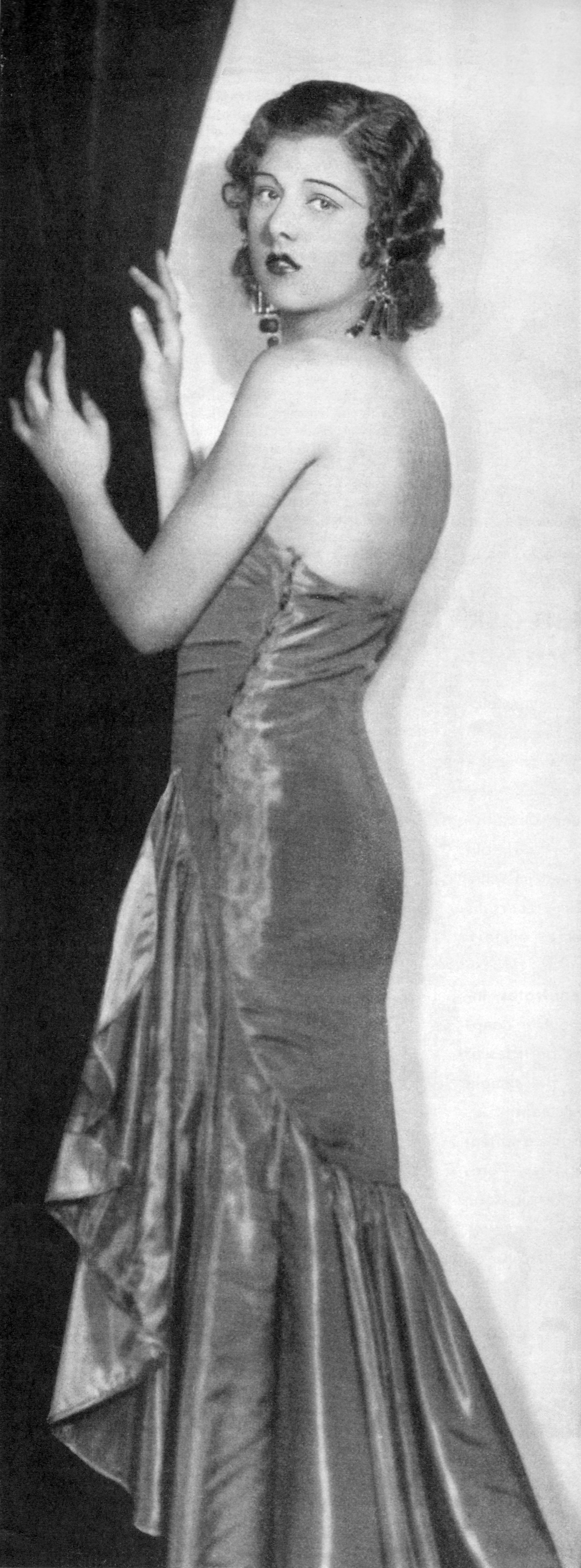
Libby Holman in 1930

Holman had a variety of relationships with both men and women during her lifetime, most prominently with DuPont heiress Louisa d'Andelot Carpenter. Although friendly and affectionate to Smith, who was eight years her junior, friends felt she treated him like an "amiable buffoon."

Smith continued to follow Libby in his plane, behaving increasingly erratically: in summer of 1930, he rented a cottage nearby Carpenter's house, with whom Holman was staying. When the pair sailed to Europe, he had private detectives find where they were staying in Paris and appeared on their doorstep. After following her back to the U.S., the two quarreled often as Smith repeatedly implored Holman to quit her career to marry him. They would fight in front of Holman's friends at the Harlem speakeasies they liked to frequent. After one particular row, Smith flew west and passed the remaining summer in California and Colorado, though still continued to call Holman regularly on the telephone. On one occasion he landed in Denver, checked into the Brown Palace Hotel, and called Holman's apartment drunk. Over the call, he told her that if she didn't promise to marry him, he would kill himself. Holman managed to talk him down, then took a taxi to Webb's house to furiously vent to his mother that she'd "put herself on the spot for that damn fool kid."

Holman went on to star in the hit Broadway revue Three's a Crowd. Smith joined her in New York as the show cycled through over 200 performances; he saw almost every performance, sitting in the front row. Although they began dating and were identified as a couple, they continued to fight and Smith continued to threaten suicide.

In June 1931, Smith rented a home near Holman's residence in Sands Point, New York. While they continued to see each other, tension arose as Holman continued her longtime relationship with Carpenter. On one occasion, Holman and Carpenter, along with Holman's sister Marion, Tallulah Bankhead and Bankhead's sister Eugenie, left Smith behind and sailed the Long Island Sound for a week on a yacht belonging to Louisa's father. After their return Smith and Holman were able to spend time together, but continuously fought. At one point, after Smith allegedly came across Holman and Carpenter together, he angrily sped off in his Rolls-Royce roadster, drove it off a four-foot retaining wall and crashed into the ocean.

Flight instructor Peter Bonelli later remembered an episode in which Smith expressed suicidal inclination. Holman, but not Smith, had been invited to a party hosted by the actress Beatrice Lillie; upon learning he was being excluded, Smith hurried to the nearby airfield. Bonelli found him readying his plane for takeoff in tears: "I thought he had had another fight with Libby - he was always upset after these - and tried to kid him out of his mood...He told me that Beatrice Lillie was trying to break up his affair with Libby, that she was throwing a party for Libby but failed to invite him, although she knew that he was staying at Libby's cottage." Then, "He hopped off without giving his motors more than a minute's warming up. He zoomed up off the ground crazily. I thought he was going to crash. His plane wobbled but he held her nose up, then, straight as a crow flies, he headed out into the ocean...He was gone for seven hours and when he returned he admitted that he had intended flying straight out until, gas exhausted, he would fall into the ocean. The least little mechanical trouble would have finished him."

On the opposite side of the spectrum, Smith also showered Libby with affection: once, he flew a low-flying plane over the Sands Point house, dropping rose petals by hand along the cottage's private walk to the beach.

During the investigation into Smith's death in 1932, Holman would claim that he was deathly afraid of being kidnapped for ransom. She described incidents of paranoia, such as Smith leaving a dummy on top of his bed while he himself slept under it; lurking around the house with a pistol if he heard a strange noise; accidentally firing the pistol inside the cottage on one occasion; and, once, upon hearing people talking outside the house, jumping out the back window and running two miles for police. However, biographers Patrick Reynolds and Tom Shachtman doubt the veracity of these statements. Police reports describing any of these incidents were never filed; furthermore, Holman claimed he was petrified of kidnappers before the time that the Lindbergh kidnapping had gripped the national public consciousness.

=== Divorce and remarriage ===
On August 26, 1931, Smith had his Savoia-Marchetti plane hauled aboard the Cunard liner RMS Berengaria and sailed to Southampton, England, then flying to London, to begin his 1931 round-the-world flight. However, he contracted the flu while staying in a London hotel. Newspapers quoted alleged despondent letters said to have been sent to Holman while he was horribly ill: "I have been sick. I don't know what's the matter, but I never felt more like dying in a long time." Another alleged letter dated to September cabled her: "Why return now? Meet you later — but suicide is preferable. This is the last cable. Love, Smith," and another of the alleged same day: "Darling Angel. I would gladly come home if you were not going on with the show. I'll gladly give up this trip or anything I have to devote all my time to you, if you would do the same for me. If I get to the point where I simply cannot stand it without you for another minute, well, there's the old Mauser with a few cartridges in it. I guess I've had my inning. It's time another team went to bat." In their book The Gilded Leaf, biographers Patrick Reynolds and Shachtman speculate that Reynolds' purported repeated references to suicide were a form of emotional manipulation to obtain affection from Holman.

A mastoid infection forced Smith to return to the U.S. for treatment. After a successful surgery, he flew Anne out to Reno, Nevada, known informally as the "Divorce Capital of the World." In 1927, the required residency for citizenship — and then a divorce — had only been six months; in 1931 it was further reduced to only six weeks. A variety of "divorce ranches" were created to cater to the wealthy coming to seek "quickie" divorces. Anne stayed at the "Lazy Me" ranch owned by Cornelius Vanderbilt Jr. to put in her residency. In the deposition of the divorce, she reported that Smith made her feel "terribly nervous and upset." Smith testified that they separated because: "She likes big parties and I like small parties." The divorce was finalized November 23, 1931. The terms of the separation included that Anne would receive $500,000 of the trust he would come into, with their infant daughter Anne receiving the same amount. In his 1932 diary, after Smith's death, Brackett wrote: "... Smith Reynolds, when he came to New York, evidently felt a Theda Bara lure in her [Holman] and they were married. I am sorry to report that Howard Dietz [Libby's friend] tells me that early in the acquaintance Libby said, "'If the Cannon girl got a million out of this, why shouldn't I get five million?'"

Six days later, on November 29, 1931, Smith married Holman in the parlor of the justice of the peace in Monroe, Michigan. There was no time for a honeymoon: the new Libby Reynolds left to go back on tour, and Smith took his 17,000-mile journey. Both agreed to meet in Hong Kong for an official honeymoon. After the trip was over, the couple returned to the U.S. and settled for the summer at the Reynolda House.

== Death ==
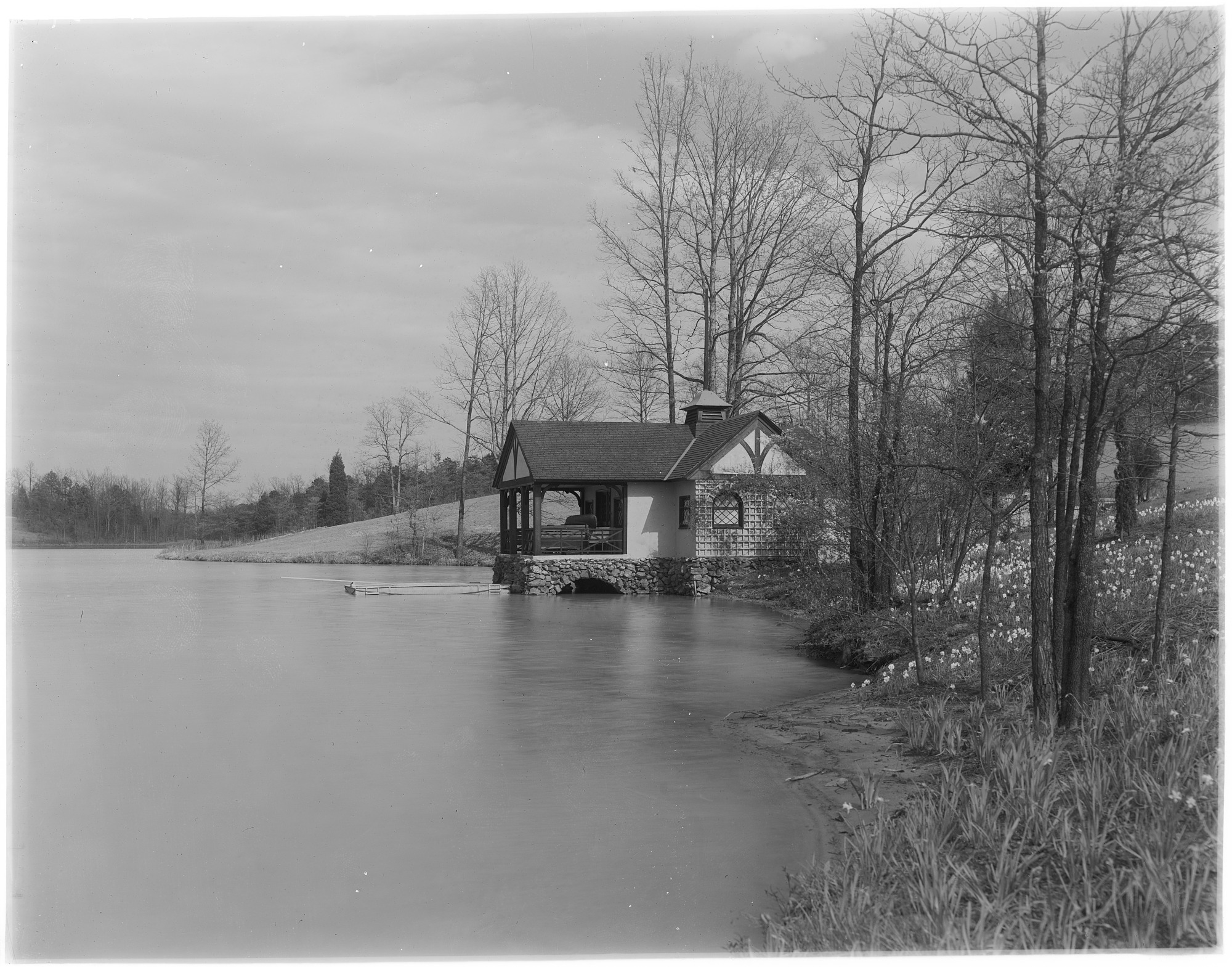
Lake Katharine boathouse in 1919, at which the party took place in 1932.

Smith Reynolds died, under mysterious circumstances, from a shot to his head from a semi-automatic Mauser .32 caliber pistol in the early morning of July 6, 1932, after a 21st birthday party for his childhood friend, Charles Gideon Hill Jr. After the party guests had left, the only people in the house aside from Reynolds and Holman were Albert "Ab" Bailey Walker, Smith's boyhood friend and personal assistant; and actress Blanche Yurka, friend of Holman. Walker reported during the inquest that he heard the gunshot while downstairs, and immediately afterwards Holman had run to the balcony and shouted, "Smith's killed himself!" Walker said he found Smith bleeding and unconscious upstairs, with a bullet wound in his right temple. With Holman and Yurka's help, Walker brought Smith to North Carolina Baptist Hospital.

=== Aftermath ===
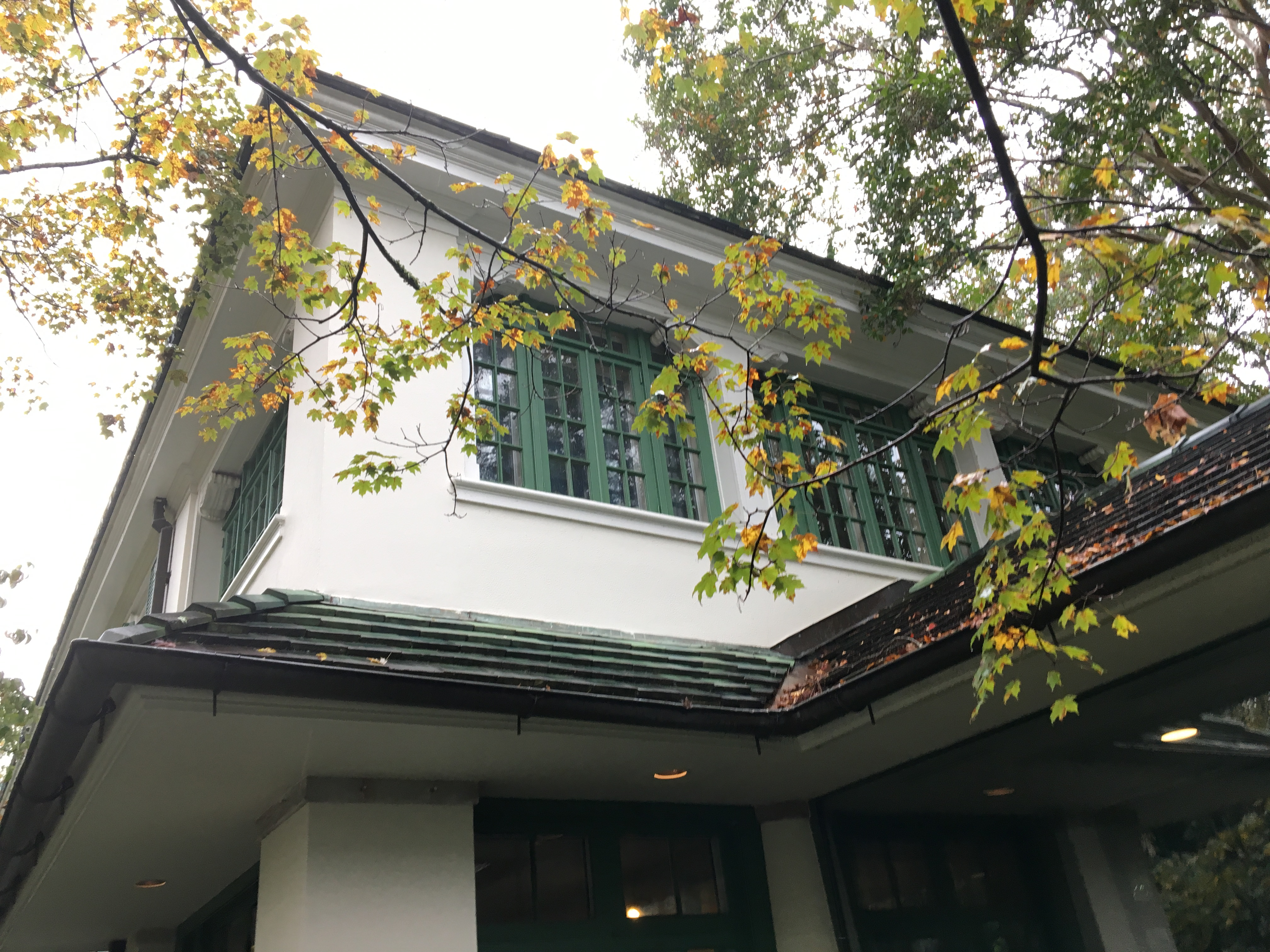
Ground view of the East sleeping porch where Smith Reynolds was shot

Smith was pronounced dead at 5:25 a.m. On the same day, the Forsyth County coroner recorded and announced the death as a suicide. However, a coroner's inquiry subsequently proclaimed that the death was the result of a bullet fired by "a person or persons unknown." The terminology was tailored to legally exclude Smith as the firer of the gun, ruling out suicide and suggesting murder instead. Both Walker and Holman were considered suspects and were eventually indicted, in order to investigate further through an official trial, for first-degree murder of Smith—Holman for the suspected murder itself and Walker as an accomplice. The case attracted national attention. Reporters printed dramatic allegations that Holman had conducted an affair with Walker, and that the two deliberately murdered Reynolds. However, William Neal Reynolds, Smith's uncle, told the district attorney that the family believed the death was a suicide and that they supported dropping the charges; the prosecutor eventually did so for lack of evidence, and no trial was ever held.

The trauma of Smith's death followed Holman for the rest of her life. She died by suicide June 18, 1971. Friend and former lover Ned Rorem recorded in his diary on June 22:

Libby Holman has killed herself. Somehow this doesn't come as a surprise. For if Libby was the richest woman in the world (becoming richer as the men in her life died off,) also celebrated and honored with special friendships, the specter of violence tracked her from the start. (She once said: You want to know the truth? The night Smith Reynolds died I was so drunk I can't remember what happened!)

That Holman was unable to remember what happened on the night of the shooting – including whether she shot him or not – is repeated by biographer Jon Bradshaw's work. Bradshaw relates from interviews with still-living friends that Holman called them on the telephone in a panic: "She told Louisa [Carpenter] that the Reynolds family were being horrible to her, almost as though they suspected that she had something to do with Smith's demise. But unfortunately Libby could not remember anything. 'I was so drunk last night,' she said, 'I don't know whether I shot him or not.'"

Zachary Smith Reynolds is buried in the Salem Cemetery in Winston-Salem.

== Legacy ==
=== Philanthropy ===
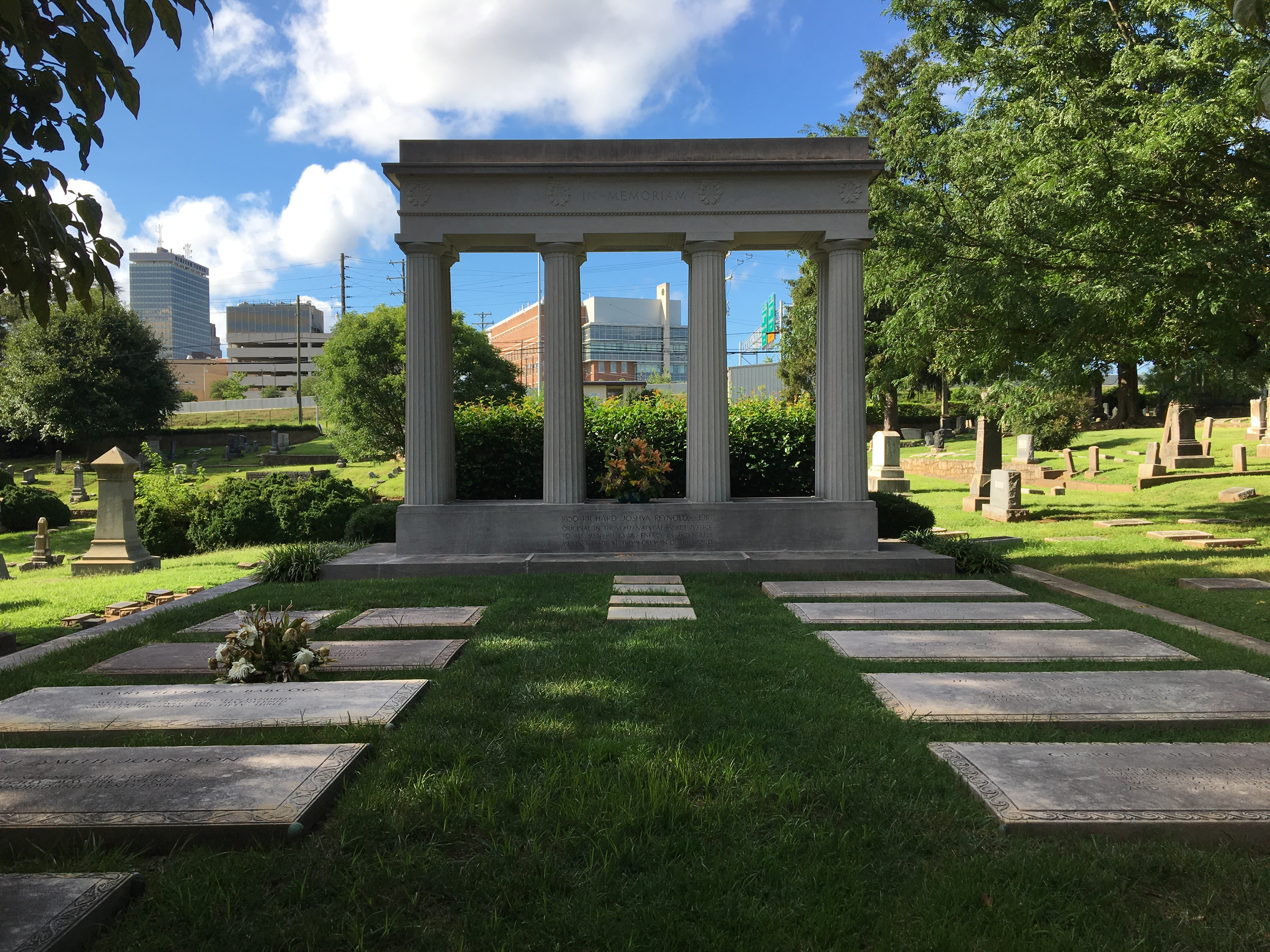
Reynolds family grave in Salem Cemetery, Winston-Salem, North Carolina

Reynolds' siblings underwent a prolonged fight to receive their share of Smith's estate, after which in 1936 they established a trust in his name that provided for his namesake foundation, the Z. Smith Reynolds Foundation. The foundation's first grant in 1937 went towards the North Carolina State Health Department's activities to treat venereal disease in North Carolinians, with $1.5 million being contributed over the course of the ten-year grant. Its financial gifts were instrumental in moving all of Wake Forest University from Wake Forest, North Carolina, to Winston-Salem in 1956. Additional activities include the creation of the Mary Reynolds Babcock Professorship at Davidson College; Katharine Smith Reynolds Scholarships at University of North Carolina at Greensboro; and scholarships for the Stouffer Foundation.

In addition, Winston-Salem's local airport, Smith Reynolds Airport, and the main library at Wake Forest University, the Z. Smith Reynolds Library, are named after Smith. The former Miller Municipal Airport was renamed in 1942 after the Z. Smith Reynolds Foundation gave funds for its expansion and modernization, allowing it to increase commercial service.

=== Children ===
==== Anne Reynolds Forsyth ====
Reynolds's daughter Anne was raised primarily by her grandmother, Annie Ludlow Cannon, who worked to keep her granddaughter shielded from the press. While growing up she lived primarily between the Cannon residence in Concord and their summer home in Blowing Rock. After the highly publicized legal proceedings resulting in her gaining a portion of her father's inheritance, she was referred in the press as possibly "the richest baby in the world."

In the post-Lindbergh kidnapping years, wealthy families feared ransoms and kidnapping threats. During Anne's childhood her grandparents received a death threat in reference to their granddaughter. In response they hired full-time Pinkerton agents who lived in a detached bedroom on the lower floor of the Blowing Rock estate, accompanying Anne outside the house even on play-dates with other children.

Although rarely appearing in society, Anne was an ardent horsewoman and participated in the annual Blowing Rock Horse Show. In 1948, at the age of 18, she married Lloyd "Junebug" Tate, a childhood friend and prominent horseman in the regional horse show circles. Tate inherited Anne's portion of Smith's estate, valued at $9 million, when she turned 21 in 1951. Her first action the same day was to donate $30,000 towards the efforts to establish the Blowing Rock Hospital, a significant donation in a rural area without access to quality healthcare. This began her career as a prominent philanthropist.

Anne's subsequent endeavors primarily focused on fighting poverty and segregation in education. She was a founder and later president for the North Carolina Fund, an experimental program inspired by Governor Terry Sanford's "war on poverty" in the state. In 1967 she founded the Anne C. Stouffer Foundation, which gave full-ride scholarships to black students to attend and integrate elite boarding schools. In creating the foundation, she felt "if we could pick out really smart kids and show these [white] boys that they [blacks] aren't just basketball players or football players or musicians, but that they are bright, with good attributes and willingness to learn... we could stop them [whites] from being bigots and help them view black people as they are — fellow human beings," though she admitted that "in the end [the program] would be far more enriching for the whites than the blacks," a sentiment echoed by former Stouffer Scholar Anthony Chase who felt that "the black students at the various schools [where Stouffer scholars attended] were there to satisfy a need white students had. In other words, it wasn't for us, we were there for them."

In 1969, Forsyth and her second husband, Dr. Harry "Frank" Forsyth, contributed to the tuition for four students out of pocket; these students were the only black women to live at Wake Forest's campus at the time. In addition to high-profile philanthropy, she also contributed anonymously to many causes. After her death in 2003, her friend Vernon Jordan recalled of her: "She was a dear and precious friend to me. I remember her for her unselfish, caring generosity. We both were interested in the South, making the South better, and making it better for blacks. She shared and she cared, and she dared, and she did." Like other Reynolds family members, she was also active working with the Z. Smith Reynolds Foundation.

==== Christopher Smith "Topper" Reynolds ====
Reynolds's second child was born after his death in January 1933 at Pennsylvania Hospital. The child was premature, only weighing 3 1/2 pounds (1.6 kg), and required care in an infant incubator directly after birth. In her first interview after the July shooting, Holman had stated she would name the child 'Smith' regardless of sex: "Boy or girl, that's to be the name." However, 'Smith' was relegated to his middle name, with Christopher as first. He would later gain the lifelong nickname of "Topper."

In August 1950, 17-year old Reynolds and his friend Stephen Wasserman spent the summer in California to work at the Cerro Gordo Mines, owned by Wasserman's father. At some point they made a plan to climb the East face of Mount Whitney, a feat only accomplished twice before by two-man teams. The two youths began their ascent on August 6; they were reported as missing on August 11. Wasserman's body was found by a rescue team August 13 at the base of a 3,000-foot sheer cliff. An advanced climbing team found Reynolds's body days later, wedged in a crevice on the cliff face. Rescuers speculated they were within 300 feet of the summit before falling; roped together, one slipping seemed to have taken the other down with them. 10 ft of snapped nylon rope was found tied to Wasserman's body, with the remaining 80 on Reynolds. After Christopher's death, the devastated Holman established the Christopher Reynolds Foundation in 1952. The foundation famously provided a significant grant supporting Martin Luther King Jr's 1959 trip to India to study the nonviolent tactics of Mahatma Gandhi

== Film and media ==
Multiple films have been inspired by the events of Reynolds' life. Two were made only three years after the scandal occurred: Sing, Sinner, Sing (1933) and Reckless (1935). Sing, Sinner, Sing, starring Paul Lukas and Leila Hyams, is the only directing credit for producer Howard Christie. Hyams plays a singer married to a wealthy playboy, who is accused of his murder on a gambling ship when all evidence points towards her. The character meant to represent Reynolds, played by Don Dillaway, is perpetually drunk throughout the film. Notable Jazz musicians Lionel Hampton and Marshal Royal can be seen in multiple scenes as part of the Les Hite Orchestra.

In Reckless, Jean Harlow plays a torch singer who becomes involved with an overzealous fan, a wealthy millionaire (Franchot Tone). Joan Crawford was originally cast as the lead role, but was replaced by Harlow a week before shooting, as producer David O. Selznick wanted to capitalize off of Harlow's romance with co-star William Powell at the time, and her own relationship to a similar scandal, the mysterious death of her former husband Paul Bern.

== See also ==
- List of unsolved deaths

== Bibliography ==
- Brackett, Charles. "It's the Pictures That Got Small": Charles Brackett on Billy Wilder and Hollywood's Golden Age. Columbia University Press, December 16, 2014. ISBN 9780231538220
- Bradshaw, Jon. Dreams That Money Can Buy: The Tragic Life of Libby Holman. William Morrow & Co, March 1, 1985. ISBN 0688011586
- Faderman, Lillian. Odd Girls and Twilight Lovers: A History of Lesbian Life in Twentieth-century America. Columbia University Press, 1991. ISBN 978-0-231-07488-9
- Gillespie, Michele. Katharine and R. J. Reynolds: Partners of Fortune in the Making of the New South. University of Georgia Press, October 1, 2012. ISBN 0820332267
- Reynolds, Zachary Smith. Log of Aeroplane NR-898W. Reynolda House Museum of American Art, 2003. [Republished version. Introduction and notes by Barbara Babcock Millhouse.]
- Mayer, Barbara. Reynolda: A History of an American Country House. Blair, April 1, 1997. ISBN 0895871556
- Machlin, Milt. Libby. Tower & Leisure Sales Co, July 1, 1980. ISBN 0505515334
- Perry, Hamilton Darby. Libby Holman: Body and Soul. Little Brown & Co, October 1, 1983. ISBN 0316700142
- Reynolds, Patrick. The Gilded Leaf: Triumph, Tragedy, and Tobacco: Three Generations of the R. J. Reynolds Family and Fortune. Little Brown & Co. ISBN 0595838316
- Tilley, Nannie M. The R.J. Reynolds Tobacco Company. Chapel Hill : University of North Carolina Press. ISBN 978-0-8078-5766-3
- Tursi, Frank (1994). Winston-Salem: A History. J.F. Blair, 1994. ISBN 0895871157
