= Z. Smith Reynolds Foundation =

Z.Smith Reynolds Foundation
- Founder: R.J. Reynolds Jr., Mary Reynolds Babcock and Nancy Susan Reynolds Bagley
- Purpose: State-Level Systemic Change Strategy; Community-Based Strategy; Exploratory, Visionary Ideas Strategy
- Location: Winston-Salem, North Carolina, United States
- Origins: Reynolds family tobacco fortune
- Region served: Piedmont Triad, North Carolina
- Method: Grants, Funding
- Key people: Maurice “Mo” Green, executive director
- Revenue: $22,168,036 (2018)
- Expenses: $20,616,224 (2018)
- Website: www.zsr.org

The Z. Smith Reynolds Foundation was formed by Mary Reynolds Babcock and her siblings to honor their brother, Zachary Smith Reynolds, who died under mysterious circumstances at the age of 20 at the Reynolds family home, Reynolda House. The Foundation donates millions of dollars annually in the state of North Carolina. In 2008, the fund donated $18 million in grants, including $2 million to Wake Forest University.

During the 2008 financial crisis, the value of the Foundation's trust declined 30% from its high of $470 million in November 2007. The Foundation subsequently announced plans to revise the way it processes grants. The Foundation, which has focused on affordable housing, immigration, education and the environment, will focus its environmental grants on water, energy and growth. The Foundation's grants were slightly less (at $16 million) than the $18 million given in 2008, but cuts were steeper in 2010 and 2011.

In the past, the foundation has paid for a study about North Carolina's Work First welfare reform program, conducted by University of North Carolina at Chapel Hill researchers.
