= Gottfried Aust =

German potter (1722–1788)

- Born: 5 April 1722; Heidersdorf, Germany
- Died: 27 October 1788 (aged 66); Lititz, Pennsylvania, U.S.

Gottfried Aust (5 April 1722 – 27 October 1788) was a German master potter. He was the first master potter in the Moravian community in today's Old Salem, North Carolina.

== Early life ==
Aust was born in Heidersdorf, Germany. After learning the weaving trade from his father, he left his family home in 1742 for the Moravian congregation in Herrnhut, over 60 miles (97 km) away. There, he learned the pottery trade from Andreas Dober. A decade later, he moved to Niesky, where he remained for two years.

He sailed from London, aboard the Irene, on 22 September 1754, and arrived in New York two months later. He settled in Bethlehem, Province of Pennsylvania, working for master potter Johann Michael Odenwald. He moved to Bethabara, Province of North Carolina, part of the Wachovia Tract, in October 1755, shortly after the Moravian Church expanded to the American South from Pennsylvania.

== Career ==
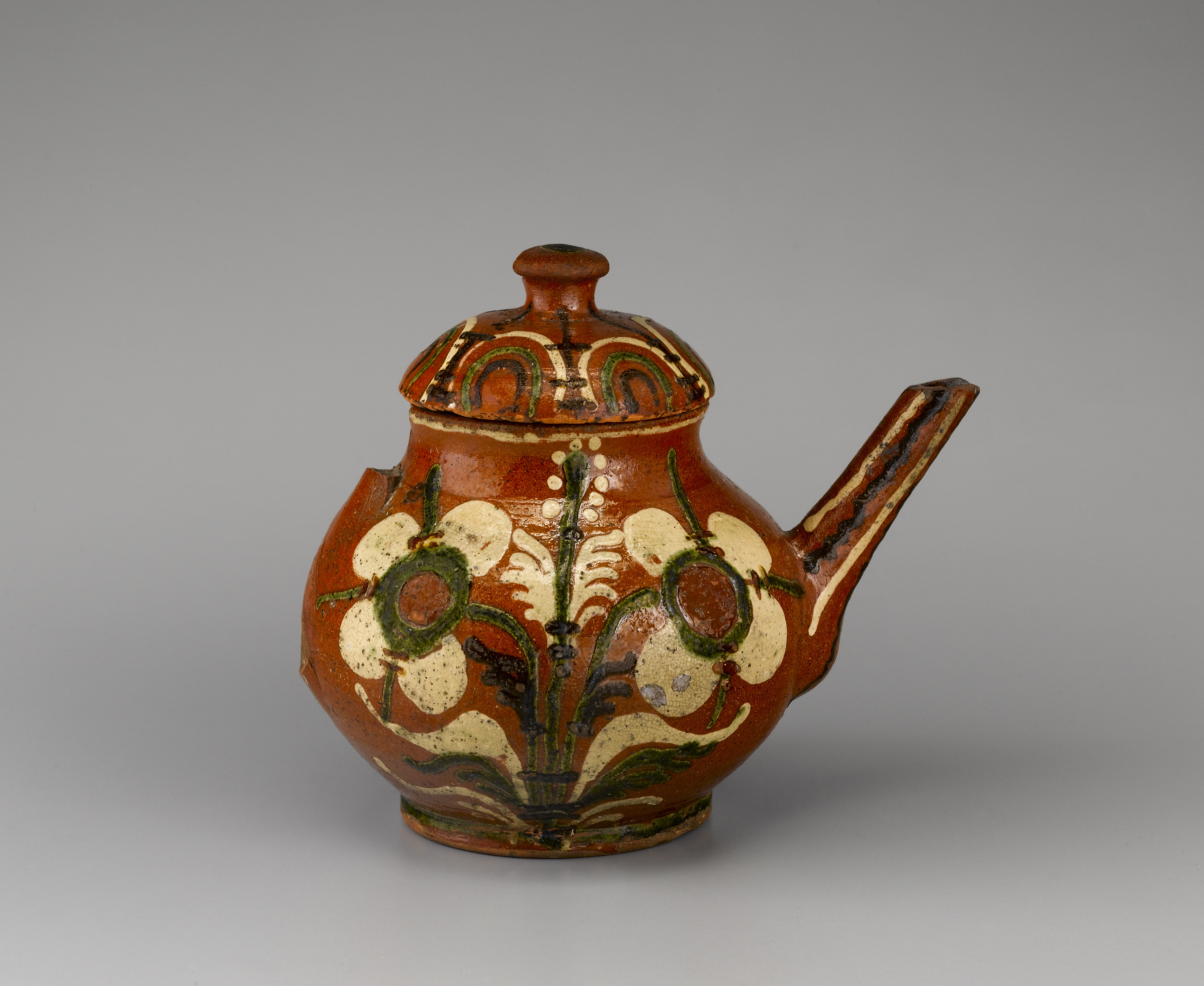
One of Aust's earthenware teapots, with slip decoration, created between 1756 and 1771.

Aust was a pioneer in the use of creamware, white, salt-glazed stoneware and tin-glazed earthenware. His apprentices included Rudolph Christ.

The former location of Aust's pottery in Old Salem (and believed to be the first pottery shop in the colony) is now occupied by the Dr. John Francis Shaffner House, which was built in 1873.

== Personal life ==
Aust was married three times, firstly to Anna Felicitas Grosch Heckedorn in 1765. They had one son, John Gottfried. Anna died in 1778, and Aust remarried, to Christine Dixon, the following year. She died of smallpox shortly after their marriage. Aust returned to Bethlehem to marry Maria Hirt. The couple returned to the Province of North Carolina. They had one child, in 1782, but it was stillborn.

Future Salem master mason Johann Gottlob Krause was orphaned by the age of two, and he was adopted Aust and Felicitas Grosch. Krause ran away from home in 1773, but returned to become Aust's apprentice the following year. Their conflict continued, however, and the town moved Krause to the Single Brothers' House.

Historians have described Aust as "grouchy, ill tempered, crusty, of a choleric nature, irascible, opinionated, and independent".

== Death ==
Aust died in 1788, aged 66, while in Lititz, Province of Pennsylvania. Ill with cancer on his face, he travelled to the town for treatment. He was interred in a Moravian cemetery there. He was succeeded as Old Salem's master potter by his protege, Rudolph Christ. Aust's original shop sign, and a 21-inch pottery plate from 1773, are on display in Old Salem.
