= Jāņi =

Latvian summer solstice festival

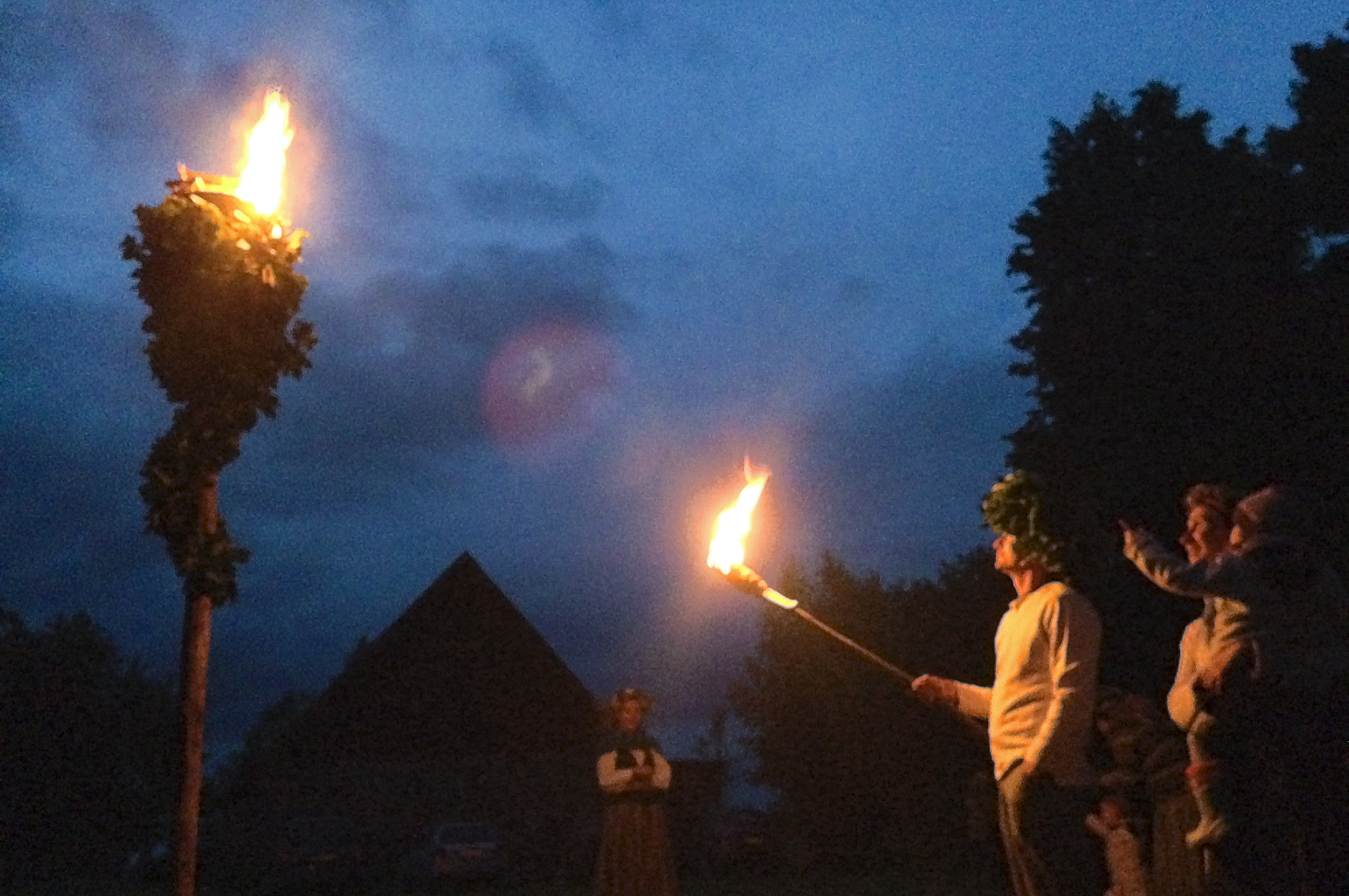
A man with an oak leaf wreath lighting up a pūdele (a container filled with tar, decorated with oak leaves and attached atop of a pole).

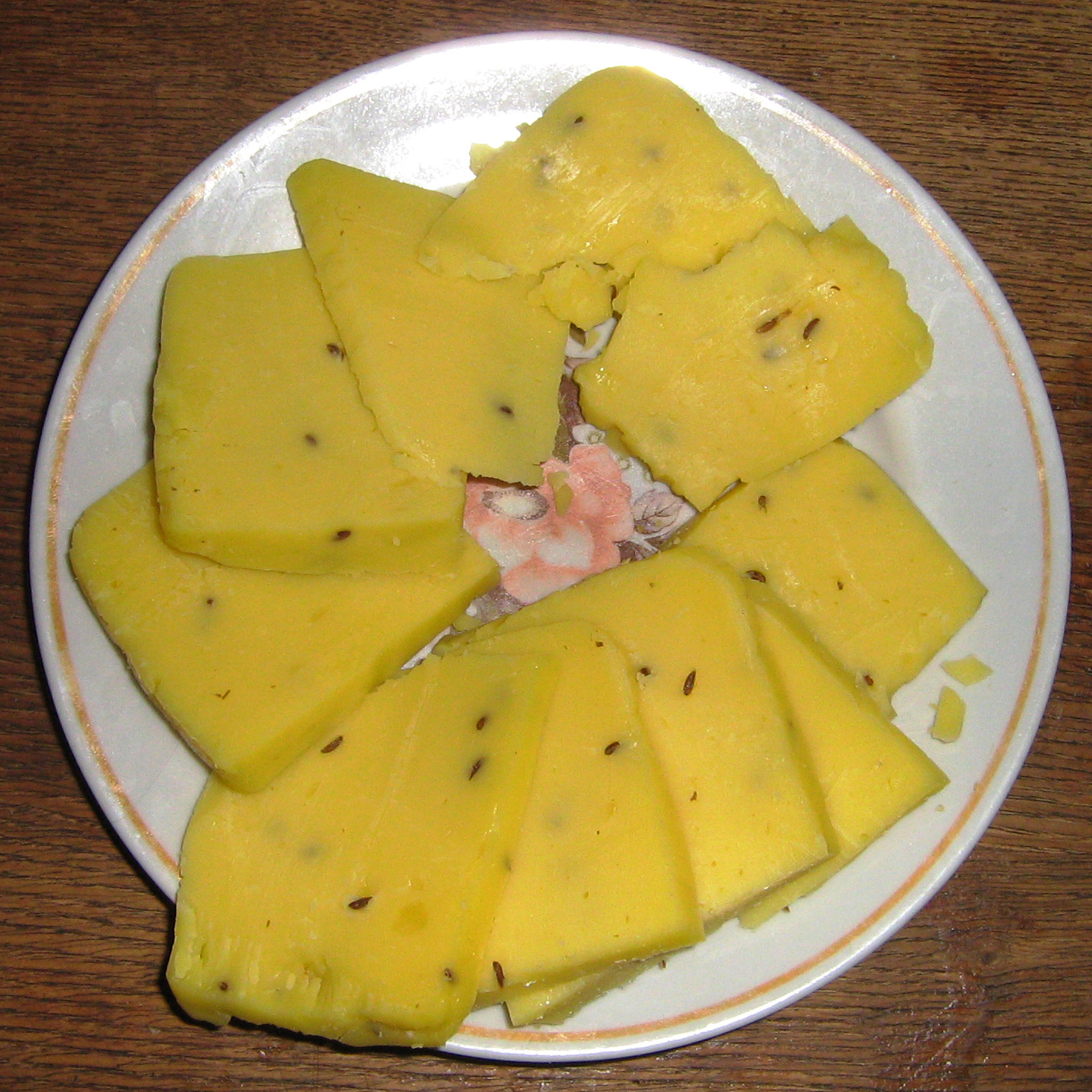
Jāņi cheese

Jāņi ([jɑːɲi]) is an annual Latvian festival celebrating the summer solstice. Although, astronomically the solstice falls on the 21st or 22nd of June, the public holidays—Līgo Day and Jāņi Day—are on the 23rd and 24th of June. The day before Jāņi is known as Līgosvētki, Līgovakars or simply known as Līgo.

On Jāņi, people travel from the city into the countryside to gather and eat, drink, sing and celebrate the solstice by observing the ancient folk traditions relating to renewal and fertility.

It is celebrated both in Latvia and in many areas where the Latvian diaspora lives such as the United States, Canada, Argentina, and Australia.

== Etymology ==
The name stems from the pre-Christian Latvian name of Jānis and had been found in written sources as early as the 19th century. The name stems from the verb jāt 'to come/ride/go' as a reference to the passage of the seasons and the advance of the cosmic flow.

The name Līgo or Līgosvētki was first used and introduced in 1900 in his Jāņi songs collection by Emilis Melngailis, who would later express regret for his decision in through newspaper "Jaunākās Ziņas":

By issuing my first collection, which included only Jāņi songs, I (Melngailis), on a new day – 1900 – following the spoken language, that Jānis is not Latvian, I had invented a new word Līgosvētki, which for some time suppressed the real ancient word: Jāņa diena, Jāņanakts; since silliness has often landed a place of honor, end of the table, at least for a short time."

— Emilis Melngailis, "Jaunākās Ziņas", 1928

Occasionally used in the 20th and 21st century, the use of Līgo as a word to describe the whole celebration is still debated. "Līgo" is not a noun but instead is a verb or interjection and thus cannot denote an object in Latvian. Linguists have stated that either Līgo is simply a misused refrain sung in many traditional Jāņi songs or that it comes from the name Līgā or Līgo - a purported minor Livonian pagan deity representing merriment and amity. The worship of this deity by a vaidelotis (Latvian pagan priest) is depicted in the flag of the Latvian Song Festival which was made for the initial edition in 1873 and is displayed in every opening ceremony of the following editions.

== Traditions ==
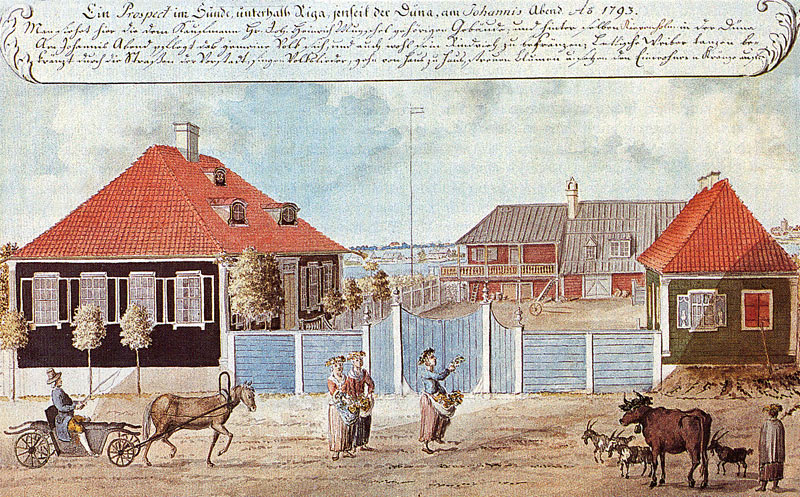
Jāņi Eve by Muižeļa Manor in 1793 (Brotze).

=== Use of plants ===
Plant material, collected and used for decorative, therapeutic and other symbolic purposes, is important in the celebration of Jāņi. Most herbaceous plants are used, but people typically collect bedstraw, cow wheat, vetchling and clover.

Plant material is used to decorate rooms, courtyards, yards, and woven into wreaths. Specific tree species are used as sources of material for decoration. Birch boughs and oak branches are commonly used, however aspen and alder are not as they are considered evil. Some herbs were collected at noon, others on Jāņi Eve, or on Jāņi morning when covered in dew. In 1627, P. Einhorn wrote:

Jāņi Day is given the power and sanctity of the herbs and its daily gathering, and has great and excellent properties against fires, people's and livestock's evil plagues and diseases

— Paul Einhorn. "Idolatry and superstition refutation"

During Jāņi, foliage of rowan, oak, linden and birch trees is collected and hung to decorate homes, barns and granaries, as well as tied to gates, doors, and cars. Thorns, thistles, and nettles are hung to repel evil spirits and witches. In past times, herbaceous plants were dried and fed to cows shortly after calving during winter and spring. On Zāļu Day, herbs were used to make a tea which was given to sick people and livestock. On Jāņi Day, rowan twigs were tied together, dried and used for child's fumigation, to treat sickness, anxiety, or where a child was afflicted by an evil eye.

==== Wreath making ====
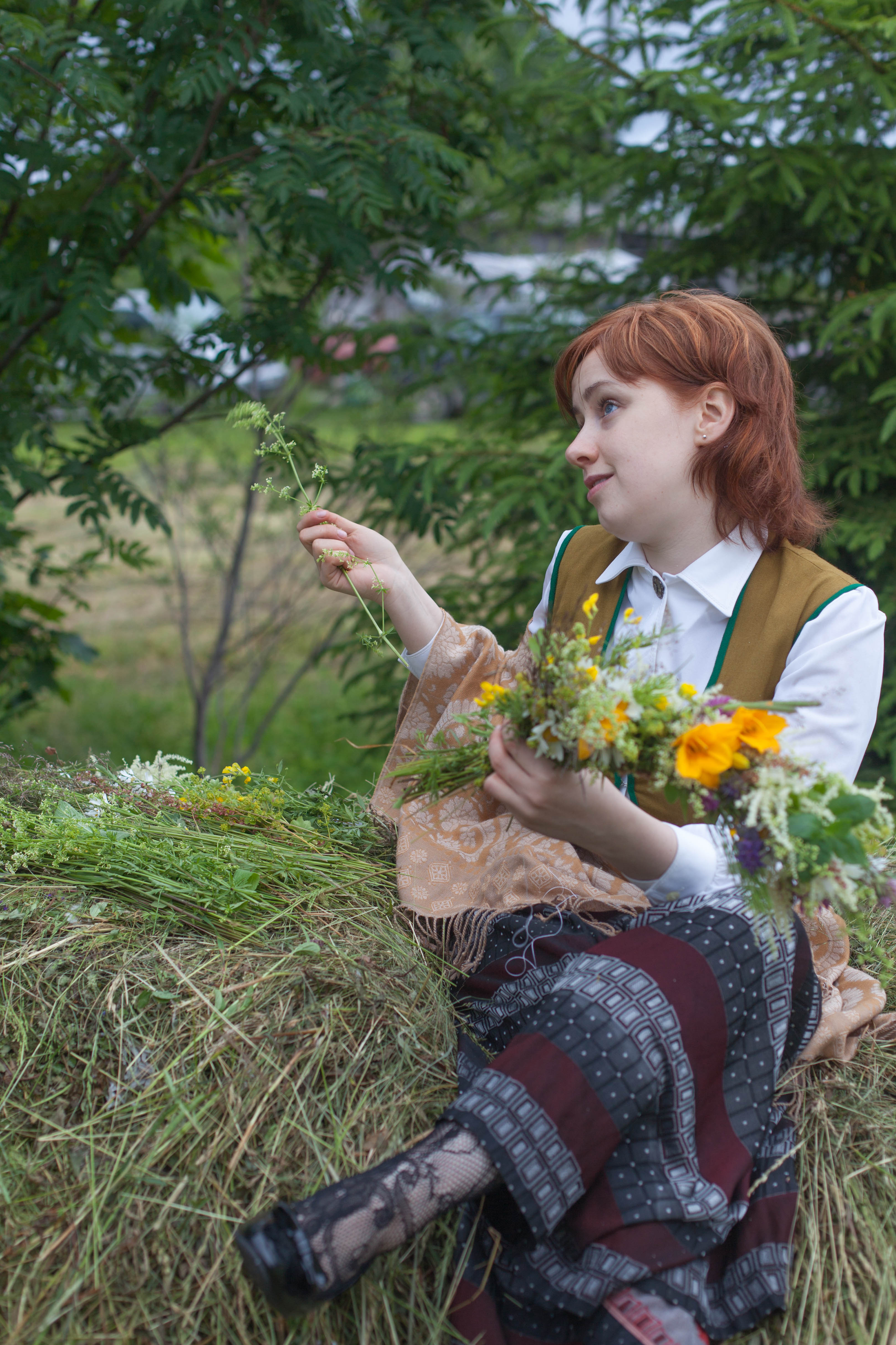
A girl weaving a flower wreath

Circular wreaths made of flowers, grasses and oak leaves are woven and worn on the head. Different types of plants are used to make wreaths for males and females. Women and girls wear wreaths made from flowers, grasses, and herbs. It is believed that wreaths braided with twenty-seven flowers and herbs prevents disasters and diseases, and repels enemies. Men and boys wear wreaths made of oak leaves, symbolising the physical strength of the oak tree. Oak wreaths were also thought to promise the blessing of horses and bees. Together with Jāņi cheese and fires, wreaths are also symbols of the sun.

=== Fire ===
During Jāņi, fires (also known as pūdeļa, pundeļa, Jāņi candles, and witch burning) are lit and burned from sunset till next morning. This practice reflects the belief that light from the fires will transmit to the next solar year. It is believed that fires should be burned at a high point in the landscape, from which the light of the fire bestows power and fertility on the fields and people on which it shines. Leaping over the Jāņi fire is said to bring good luck and health through the coming year.

While fires are typically wood-fuelled, tar barrels or tarred wheels hoisted on poles are also burned.

=== Singing ===
Singing Līgo songs or Jāņi songs is associated with the promotion of fertility, acquisition of good fortune and prevention of calamity. Historically, the singing of Līgo songs began two weeks before Jāņi, reached its highest point on Jāņi Eve and lasted until Peter or Māras Day (15 August)—a period of around a month. After that, the singing of Līgo songs ceased until the next year. Singing Ligo songs on Jāņi night begins after dinner and continues throughout the night until the rising of the sun, either during jumping over Fire of Jāņi, or while going from houses to houses. Singing visits on Jāņi were called aplīgošana, servants visited their masters, maidens visited young men and vice versa.

On Jāņi Day people drink beer and eat cheese, believing that it will promote the growth of barley and production of cow milk in the next summer. Singing visitors from neighbouring houses are treated with cheese and beer.

=== Other traditions ===
==== Witches ====
There is a belief that on Jāņi morning, milk witches were running on dew and shouted: "Everything to me, everything to me!" If anyone heard it, they must respond with: "I butchered half of them!" Then there would be no shortage of milk. Witches are believed to have disguised themselves as normal women by dressing in white robes and letting their hair loose. Once disguised, it is believed that they would set spells or curses on the fields and livestock of their enemies.

==== Fern flowers ====
It was believed that whoever found a fern flower would gain wealth and happiness and learn the secrets of the past and future. "Whoever acquires the fern flower will be happy, because it can make anything they want to come true. The flower is hindered by evil spirits and only a brave person can get it". "On Jāņi Night, jump eight times around eight while on a broom handle, which is hoisted from a ground. During this time do not talk and do not laugh. Once you have done so, then hop on the broom shaft astride to the nearest fern patch, but only on your own, then you will see the blossoming of a fern flower". ‘Looking for fern flower’ is also referred to couples excusing themselves from festivities for some intimacy and time alone.

== History ==
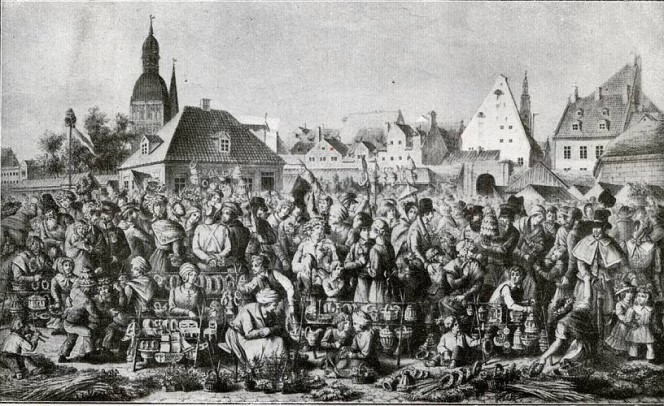
Herbal Eve at the Daugavmala (banks of the Daugava), 18th century.

Herbs and wreath traders at the Daugavmala Market in Riga, 1920.

John the Baptist Day celebration during the summer solstice time was known throughout the Christian world. Since 1584, Balthasar Russow wrote in his Chronicle of Livonia, that "All over the great land by Fire of Jāņi happened a great joyous dancing, singing and jumping".

It is known, that at that time Riga's fishermen, mast selectors and ferries each year after solstice drove boats to Pārdaugava or to some islands in the Daugava, where, together with families and guests burned bonfires, rejoicing until the morning dawn.

When, in 1759, Johann Steinhauer, a rich Latvian mast selector, bought part of Zasumuiža, it began a Herbal Eve celebration tradition. Later, the celebration was moved to Hermeliņš Manor, then on the right bank of the Daugava by the castle. Around 1790, a tradition to hold festive fireworks on Daugava was introduced. In 1820, the Riga City Council ordered to transfer Daugavmala Herbal Market to Šāļu Gate at the end of Svērtuves Street. In 1832, a Latvian weekly newspaper "Tas Latviešu Ļaužu Draugs" gave the following description of the holiday:

These two days of Jāņi for us, city dwellers, are annual real fun days. On first day's eve a large flower market opens at the edge of the Daugava. Then farmers, who were living in the vicinity, brought flowers, wreaths and various herbs, gardeners brought back their most nicest and most expensive goods, and the townsfolk came and bought – either wreaths for children's joy, or flowers for whichever loved one as a gift, or foals, or mint and other such herbs, that help against various diseases. Others come, wanting to see a large crowd, play gambling, and walk until it becomes dark.

— "Tas Latviešu Ļaužu Draugs", 1832

After Latvia gained its independence in 1918, the celebration of Zāļu diena turned into a popular holiday. It was proposed, that 22, 23 and 24 June should be recognized as national holidays, on 22 June celebrating Heroes Day (remembering the victory in Battle of Cēsis), Zāļu diena on 23 June and Jāņi Day on 24 June.

== Similar festive celebration traditions worldwide ==
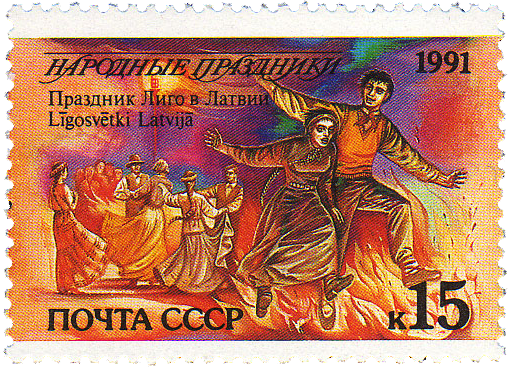
Postage stamp commemorating the Latvian Līgo festival (USSR, 1991)

Celebration of the summer solstice is an ancient European tradition. It was especially observed in countries such as Denmark, Estonia, Latvia, Lithuania, Finland, Sweden, Russia, Ireland, France, Belarus, Norway, Italy, Portugal, Malta, United Kingdom, Spain, Poland, Ukraine.

It was also observed by European settlers in Canada (especially in Quebec) and the US.
