= Elisabeth Oesterlein =

- Born: September 12, 1749; Bethlehem, Province of Pennsylvania
- Died: December 3, 1802 (aged 53); Old Salem, North Carolina, U.S.
- Resting place: God's Acre Moravian Cemetery, Old Salem, North Carolina, U.S.
- Occupation: Educator
- Spouse: Rudolph Christ (1780–1802; her death)

Elisabeth Oesterlein Christ (commonly known as Elisabeth Oesterlein; September 12, 1749 – December 3, 1802) was an American educator. She founded Salem College in today's Old Salem, North Carolina. She was also the school's first teacher.

== Life and career ==
Oesterlein was born in Bethlehem in the Province of Pennsylvania in 1749. With her fellow Moravians, she relocated to the Wachovia Tract, in the Province of North Carolina, in 1766, settling initially in Bethabara. She and fifteen other girls walked the approximately 500 miles (800 km) from Bethlehem, on the Great Wagon Road, setting out on October 2 and arriving on October 31.

She moved to Salem, Province in North Carolina, shortly thereafter, where she was elected the first teacher for a "Little Girls' School", which is today known as Salem Academy and College. In 1772, Oesterlein (known as "Sister O") began teaching a class containing three students. The enrollment increased over time, and by the early 19th century over eighty students were being taught.

In 1780, Oesterlein married Rudolph Christ, a prominent potter in Bethabara and, later, Old Salem. They had five children together: Anna Elizabeth, Benigna Elizabeth, Friedrich Jacob, Johann Rudolph and Anna Sulamith. Each child died very young, with Friedrich living the longest (to the age of 8).

== Death ==
Oesterlein died in 1802, aged 53. She is interred in the God's Acre Moravian Cemetery in Old Salem, alongside her husband, who survived her by 31 years. He remarried the year following her death.

=== Legacy ===
Each day, on Founders Day, Salem Academy presents the Elisabeth Oesterlein Award to students who have made notable contributions to the school during their four years. Her name was removed from the award after it was discovered that Oesterlein and her husband purchased an enslaved potter named Peter Oliver.
