= Christian Gottlieb Reuter =

German architect (1717–1777)

- Born: Philip Christian Gottlieb Reuter; 5 September 1717; Steinbach, Germany
- Died: 30 December 1777 (aged 60); U.S.

Philip Christian Gottlieb Reuter (5 September 1717 – 30 December 1777) was a German architect. He became an influential member of the Moravian community in the Wachovia Tract of today's North Carolina by developing the appearance of towns and the use of land. He mapped said tract and drew the town plans for Bethania, Bethabara and Salem.

== Early life ==
Reuter was born in Steinbach, Germany, the son of surgeon Dr. Johann Marsilius Reuter.

He became a member of the Moravian community, which later precipitated his move to America.

== Career ==
In 1732, Reuter became an apprentice to the surveyor Count Franz, then Count Erpach. Upon obtaining his certificate, he went to work for Frederick II, Landgrave of Hesse-Kassel. Aged 21, he was appointed royal surveyor.

He emigrated to Bethlehem, Province of Pennsylvania, in 1756. Shortly after arriving, he designed the Sun Inn, and also laid out the town plan of Lititz.

Within two years, he had moved south to Bethabara, Province of North Carolina, and set about surveying the near-100,000 acres (40,000 ha) of the Wachovia Tract. His "Great Map of 1762", which is believed to have been over 9 feet (2.7 m) long and 7 feet (2.1 m) high, has since been lost.

In 1759, Reuter laid out the town plan of Bethania, and played a major role in the layout of today's Old Salem.

After moving to Salem, in 1774 he established a drawing school for young Single Brethren.

== Personal life ==
On 18 July 1762, Reuter married Anna Catharine Antes, daughter of Johann Heinrich Antes and Christina Elizabeth Deweese. The Reuters's wedding was the first Moravian marriage in the Province of North Carolina. Reuter was her second husband, after Hans Martin Kalberlahn, who died in 1759. The Reuters had no children, but took an orphaned girl into their care.

By 1776, Reuter was "old and sickly". He was, however, able to train Ludwig Meinung as his successor.

== Death ==
Reuter died in 1777, aged 60. He was interred in the Moravian God's Acre cemetery in Old Salem. His wife, survived him by 39 years. She married two more times before her death in 1816: firstly, to Johan Casper Heinzmann, then to Johan Ernst. She outlived all of her husbands.
