= Rudolph Christ =

German potter (1750–1833)

- Born: 28 February 1750; Lauffen am Neckar, Germany
- Died: 26 July 1833 (aged 83); Salem, North Carolina, U.S.
- Resting place: God's Acre Cemetery

Rudolph Christ (28 February 1750 – 26 July 1833) was a German potter. He was a noted figure of the Moravian community in today's Old Salem, North Carolina, where he was master potter between 1789 and 1821.

== Early life ==
Christ was born in Lauffen am Neckar in Baden-Württemberg, Germany, in 1750. He emigrated with his parents, Rudolph Sr. and Anna Wolfer, to Philadelphia, Province of Pennsylvania, around 1753.

== Career ==
By 1766, when he was sixteen years of age, Christ had moved to the American colony of the Province of North Carolina, where he was working as an apprentice for compatriot Gottfried Aust, master potter in Bethabara. It is believed there was a lot of friction between them throughout their careers.

Christ moved to Salem, Province of North Carolina, in 1789, after the death of Aust. He remained there until his retirement in 1821. He held several civic roles, including being on the Congregation Council and the Aufseher Collegium.

His press-molded figural bottle has become a notable form of North Carolina Moravian pottery.

In 2016, Christ's kiln in Old Salem was excavated.

== Personal life ==
In 1780, Christ married Elisabeth Oesterlein, who founded Salem Academy. They had five children together: Anna Elizabeth, Benigna Elizabeth, Friedrich Jacob, Johann Rudolph and Anna Sulamith. Each child died very young, with Friedrich living the longest (to the age of 8).

Christ became a widower upon the death of Elizabeth in 1802, aged 53. He remarried, to Anna Christina Blum, in 1803. They had four children: Anna, Jacob Rudolph, Traugott Frederick and one who died at birth.

== Death ==
Christ died in 1833, aged 83. He is interred in Old Salem's God's Acre Moravian Cemetery, alongside his first wife.
