= Melchior Rasp =

Austrian stonemason (1715–1785)

- Born: 8 January 1715; Salzburg, Prince-Archbishopric of Salzburg
- Died: 19 March 1785 (aged 70); Salem, North Carolina
- Resting place: God's Acre Cemetery

Melchior Rasp (8 January 1715 – 19 March 1785) was an Austrian master mason. He built several notable buildings in the Moravian community in today's Old Salem, North Carolina. These buildings are some of the few that have survived.

Rasp is described as having played an important role in the early Moravian architecture in Old Salem over three decades. His most notable work is the Single Brothers' House, built in the fachwerk (or half-timbered) style in 1769.

== Early life ==
Rasp was born in the Austrian capital of Salzburg early in the new year of 1715. He worked in the salt works as a child, before moving to the Netherlands at the age of fifteen. From there, he moved again, to Frankfurt am Main, where he began to learn the trade of a mason.

In the 1740s, he was living in the Moravian town of Herrnhag, where he joined the local congregation.

== Career ==
In 1750, Rasp emigrated to Bethlehem in the Pennsylvania Colony. He remained there for five years, then moved to Wachovia, Province of North Carolina, around the same time as carpenter Christian Triebel.

Rasp was one of eight men selected to move to nearby Old Salem to begin constructing the settlement's buildings, with material brought in from Bethabara.

Johann Gottlob Krause became Rasp's apprentice in March 1781. In October 1782, Krause became a journeyman under Rasp.

=== Selected works ===
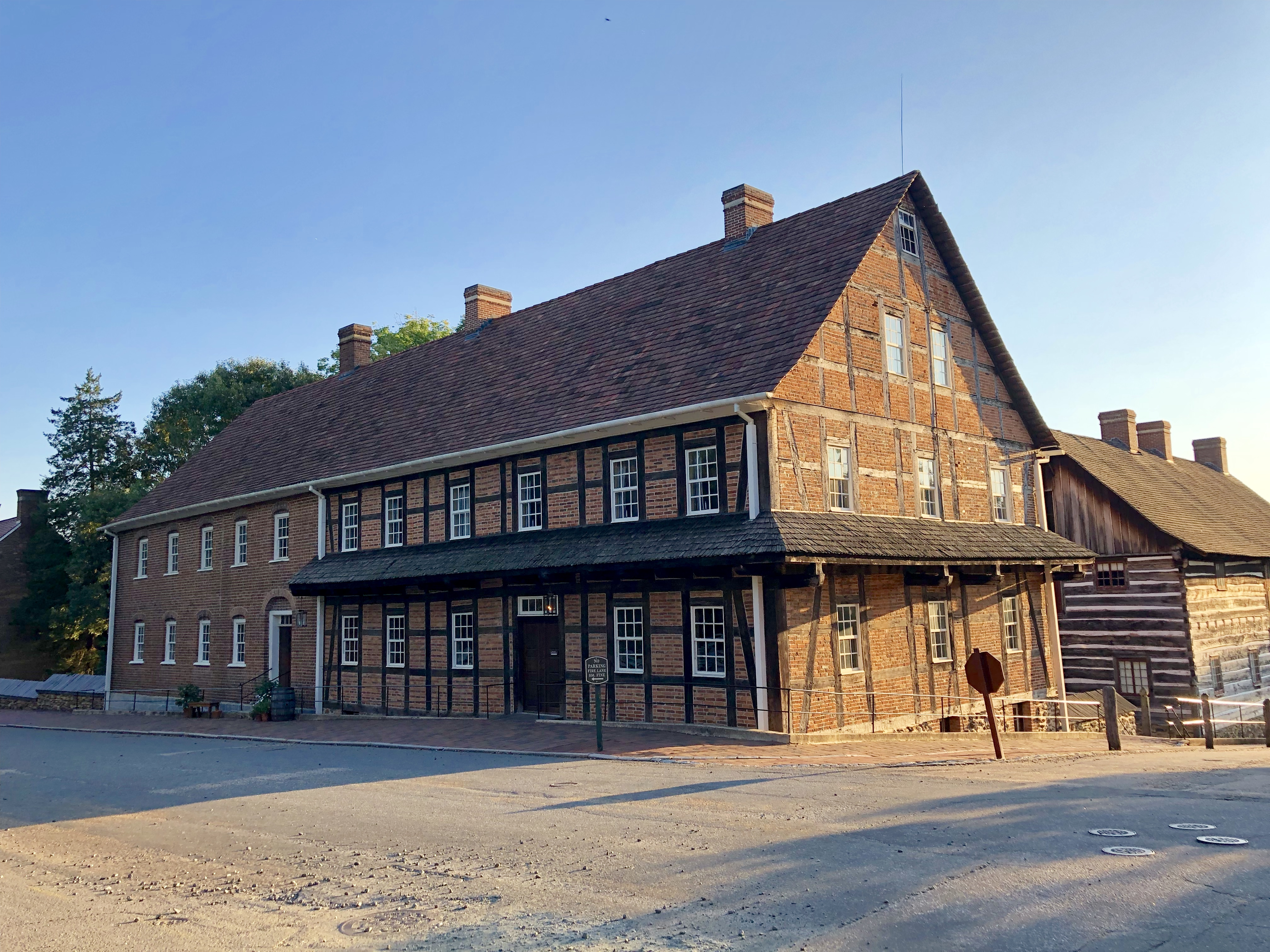
Single Brothers' House, Old Salem, North Carolina

Rasp was responsible for the construction of the following buildings:

- Nazareth Hall, Nazareth, Pennsylvania (1752)
- Single Brothers' House, Old Salem, North Carolina (1769)

== Personal life ==
Rasp endured several ailments from his profession. During one of his journeys between Bethabara and Old Salem, he fell and drove a pipe stem through the roof his mouth, which made him unable to work for two months.

In 1778, he lost an eye as a result of stone chip striking him.

By early 1784, Rasp was unable to work. He was succeeded as master mason by Krause.

== Death ==
Rasp died in 1785, aged 70. He is interred in God's Acre Cemetery in Old Salem.
