= God's Acre Cemetery (Old Salem) =

Cemetery in Forsyth County, North Carolina

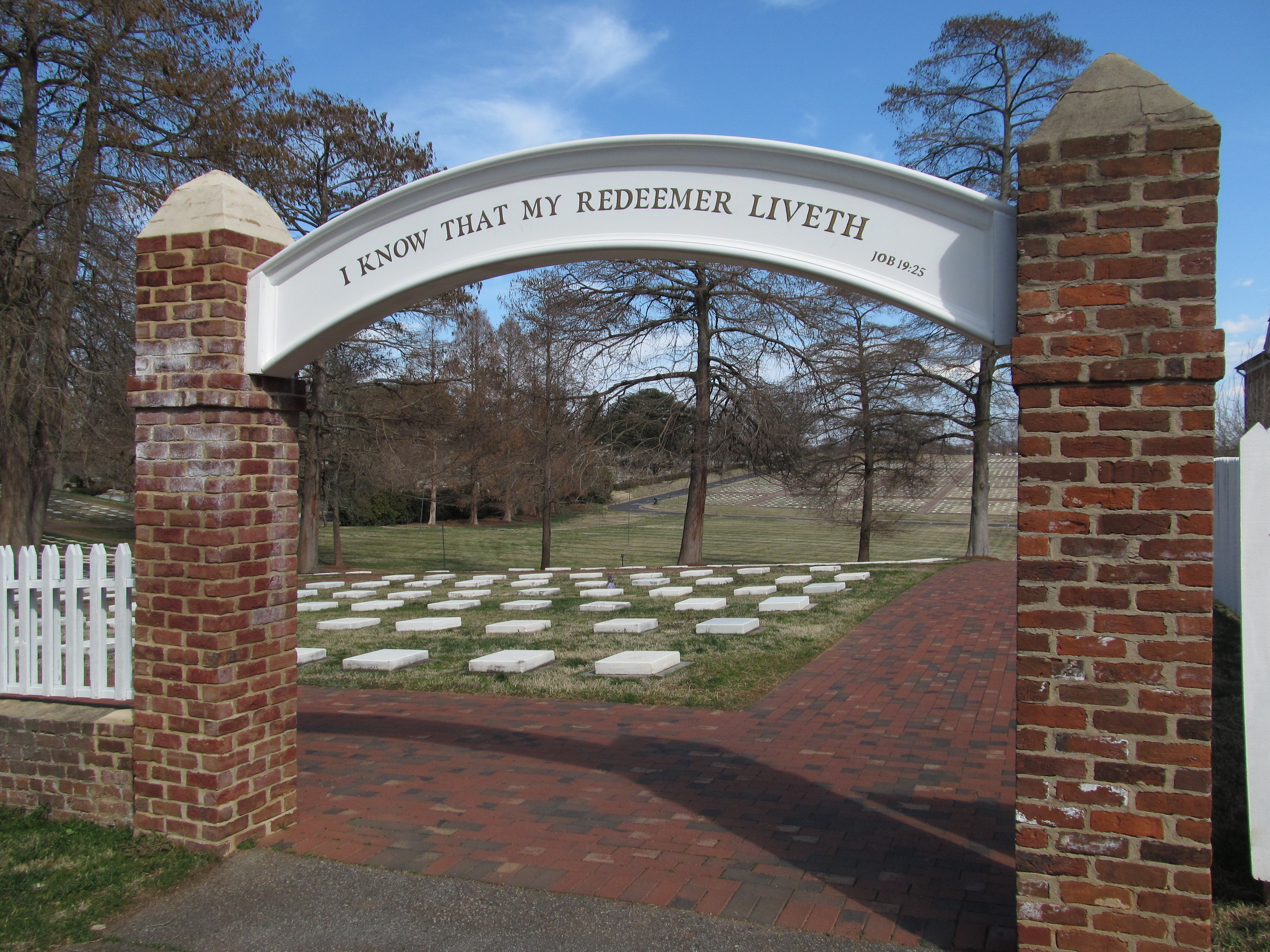
- The western entrance to the more modern eastern section, pictured in 2025
- Interactive map of God's Acre Cemetery

Details
- Established: 1771 (255 years ago)
- Location: Old Salem, North Carolina
- Country: United States
- Coordinates: 36.09015°N 80.24038°W
- Owned by: Home Moravian Church
- Size: 40 acres (16 ha)
- No. of interments: Over 6,000
- Website: http://www.salemcongregation.org/the-salem-moravian-graveyard-gods-acre/
- Find a Grave: God's Acre Cemetery

God's Acre Cemetery (also known as Salem Moravian God's Acre and Salem Moravian Graveyard) is a cemetery for the Moravian congregation in Old Salem, North Carolina. It is located around 100 yards (91 m) north of the town's Home Moravian Church and also serves the thirteen member churches of Salem's congregation: Ardmore, Bethesda, Calvary, Christ, Fairview, Fries, Home, Immanuel New Eden, Konnoak Hills, Messiah, Pine Chapel, St Philips and Trinity. St Philips has a second cemetery in the northeastern corner of the adjacent Salem Cemetery.

Burials are organized chronologically. There are no statues, only uniform square white headstones (20" x 24" x 4" for adults) laid into the ground, because Moravians believe that everyone is equal in death. The graves are arranged in line with the 18th-century choir format: men and boys are separated from women and girls. Family ties are not considered: the cemetery itself is considered a family plot.

The first burial in the cemetery was John Birkhead in 1771. The first female burial was that of Eva Anna Beroth two years later. As of 2023, the cemetery contains over 6,000 burials.

The older cemetery entrance is via Cemetery Street, to the north. The more modern eastern section is accessed from the west by Cedar Avenue, which is a narrower extension of Church Street, or from the east via East Salem Avenue. The first sign greeting visitors arriving past Cedarhyrst, a Gothic Revival house at the southern gate of Cedar Avenue, reads "I Know That My Redeemer Liveth", which is taken from the Book of Job, chapters 19 to 25. Several similar signs continue up the Cedar Avenue hill.

== Today ==
Each Saturday before Easter, the members of the Salem congregation churches decorate the graves with flowers. An Easter Sunrise Service is held the following day, in the 1970 addition of the cemetery to the east, continuing a tradition begun in 1735 in Herrnhut, Germany, and first observed in Old Salem in 1772.

On Easter morning, the congregation attend as the "Church Militant" to affirm their faith in the "Risen Lord."

== Notable burials ==
- Christian Gottlieb Reuter (1717–1777), architect
- Melchior Rasp (1715–1785), stonemason
- Christian Triebl (1714–1798), carpenter
- Elisabeth Oesterlein (1749–1802), educator
- Anna Johanna Krause (1756–1815), first child born in Bethabara
- Rudolph Christ (1750–1833), potter
- Christian Winkler (1766–1839), baker
- Don Cardwell (1935–2008), Major League Baseball pitcher
- George Hamilton IV (1937–2014), musician
- Howell Binkley (1956–2020), lighting designer
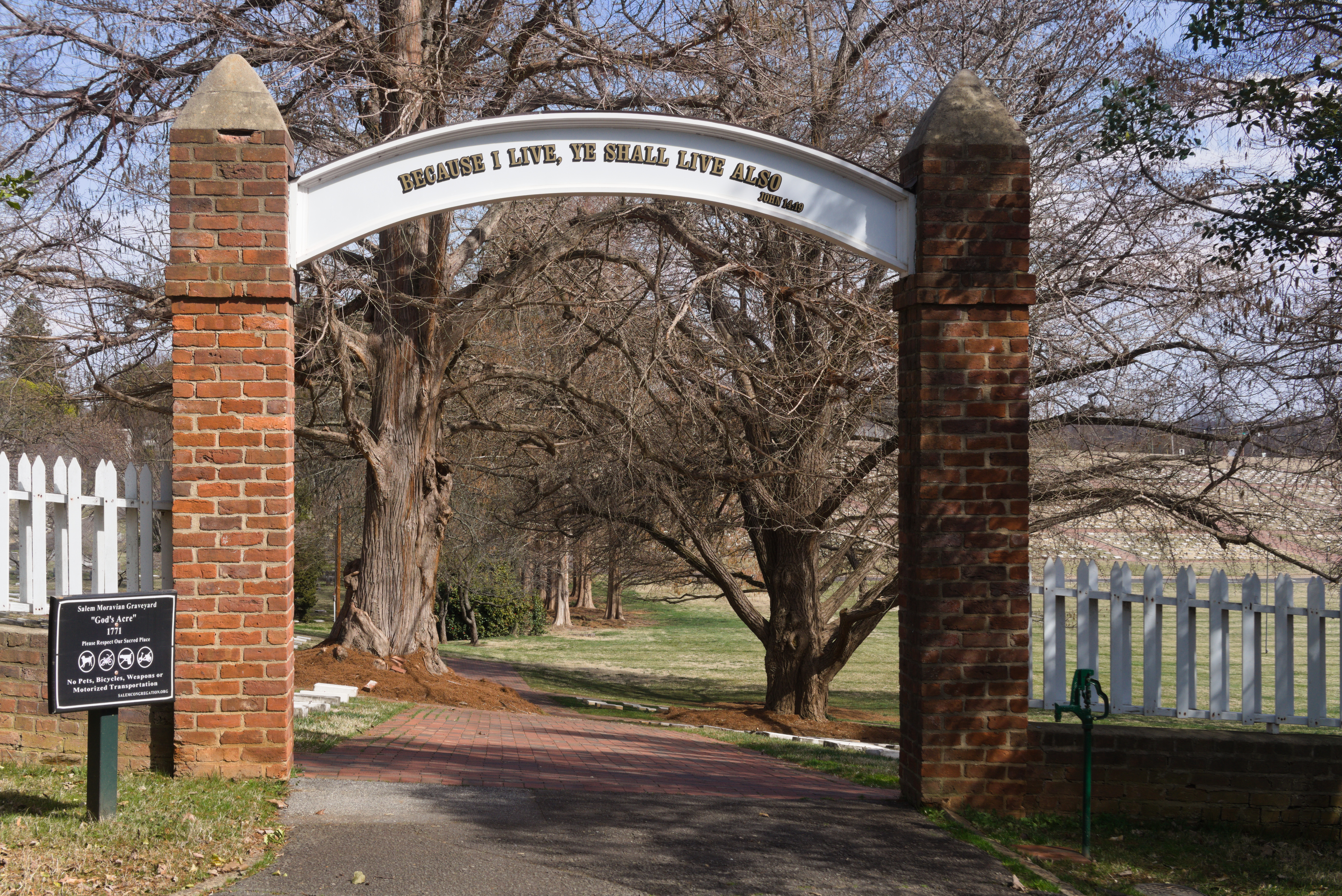
Cedar Avenue entrance

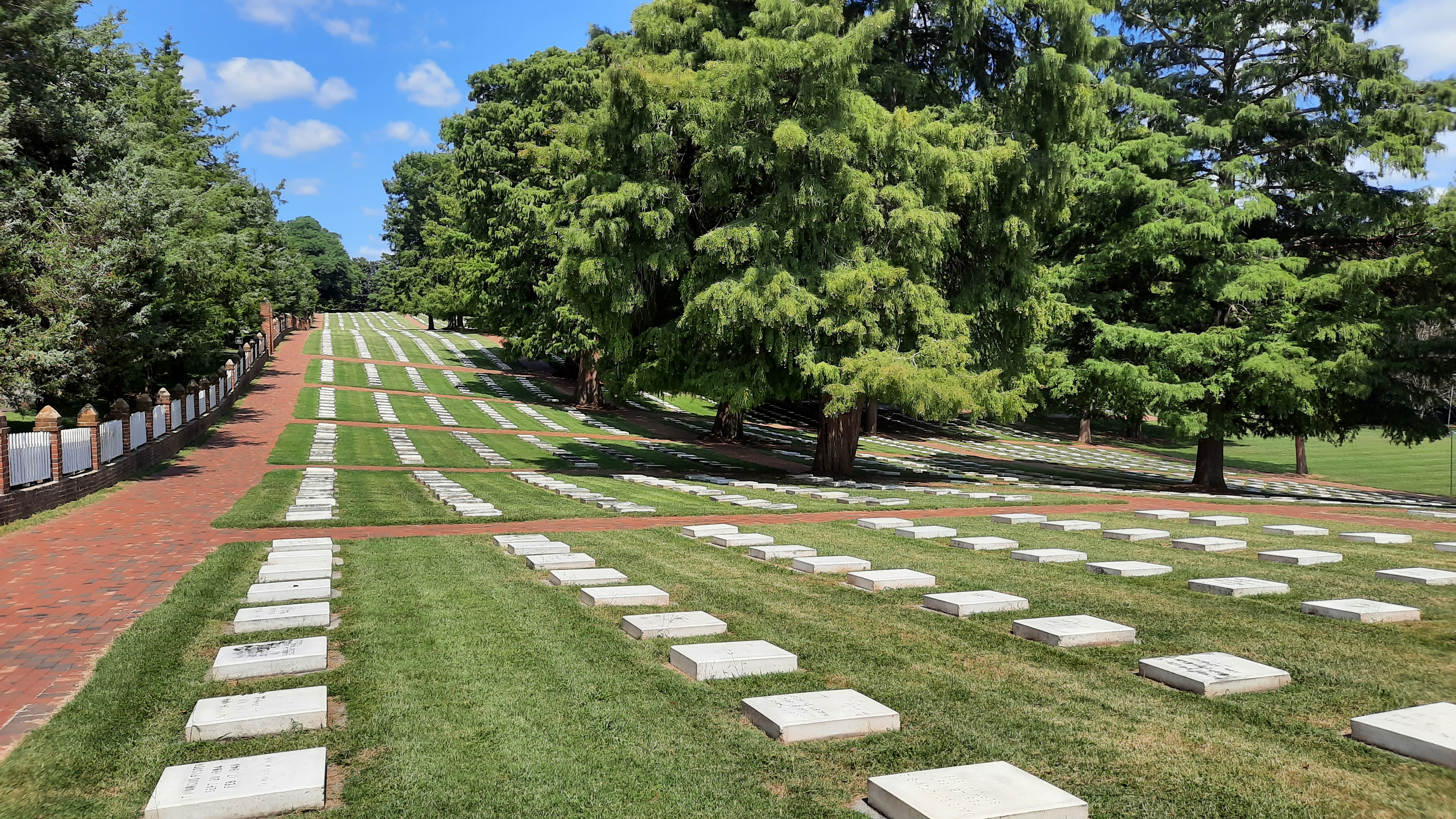
A view from just inside the western gate on Church Street

== See also ==
- God's Acre (Gottesacker)
