= Single Brothers' House =

Historic house in North Carolina, United States

- U.S. National Register of Historic Places
- U.S. National Historic Landmark
- U.S. National Historic Landmark District – Contributing property
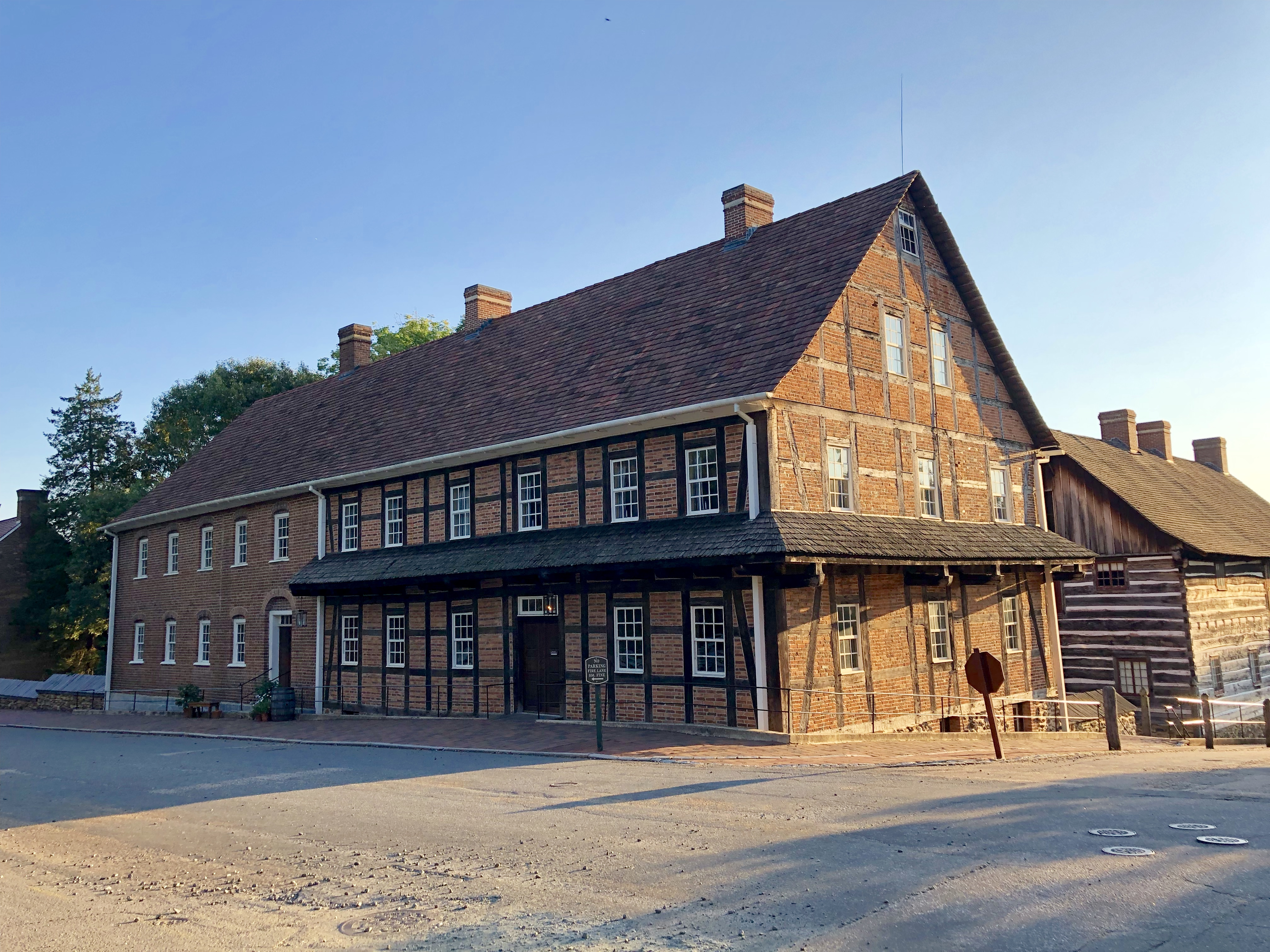
- Single Brothers' House in 2019

- Location within North Carolina Location within the United States
- Location: S. Main and Academy Sts., Old Salem, North Carolina
- Coordinates: 36°5′13.6″N 80°14′32.6″W
- Built: 1769
- Architect: Friedrich von Marschall
- Part of: Old Salem Historic District (ID66000591)
- NRHP reference No.: 70000454

Significant dates
- Added to NRHP: April 15, 1970
- Designated NHL: April 15, 1970
- Designated NHLDCP: November 13, 1966

The Single Brothers' House was built to house the Single Brethren (the unmarried men) of the Moravian Congregation of Old Salem, North Carolina. It is part of Old Salem Museums & Gardens and open as an Old Salem tour building to visitors. It is located at 600 South Main Street, at Academy Street, on the southwest corner.

== History ==
The first portion was designed by Friedrich von Marschall, a leader of the Moravian settlements. The first section was constructed, by master mason Melchior Rasp, of traditional Germanic half-timber framing, exposed brick noggin, a clay tile roof, and had a pent eave. It was completed in 1769, with carpentry work done by Christian Triebel. A later brick addition was added in 1786 by Rasp's successor, Johann Gottlob Krause to the south end. The building housed craftsmen and their apprentices, as well as providing individual trade shops. The building had kitchen and dining room, administrative offices, and a Saal (worship/meeting area). Additional buildings were constructed on the large property that provided additional space for the activities such as the (reconstructed) 1771 workshop building behind. There was also a brewery, slaughterhouse, distillery, and tannery on the parcel, as well as extensive gardens that have been partially restored.

The Single Brothers' House was closed in 1823, with the oldest part used as apartments and the brick addition as a Boys' School. The school occupied the building for six years, after which the building was primarily residential and eventually became known as the "Widow's House", since there were mainly single women and widows of the congregation living in it. The Single Sisters later took control of the property and eventually it was leased as part of the museum and restored in 1964.

The building previously belonged to the Salem Congregation, a group of Moravian churches that evolved from the original Congregational Council for Salem. It was officially acquired by Old Salem Museums & Gardens in 2024, where it continues to be part of the tour for Old Salem Museums and Gardens. During the Advent season, it is site of the Candle Tea, a fundraiser held by the Women's Fellowship of Home Moravian Church for local non-profit agencies.

It was listed as an individual National Historic Landmark in 1970, and is contributing resource of the Old Salem National Historic Landmark District designated in 1966 and updated in 2016.

The clapboard fascia of the building's right half was removed in the second half of the 20th century, revealing the brick of that of the left half.

== Gallery ==
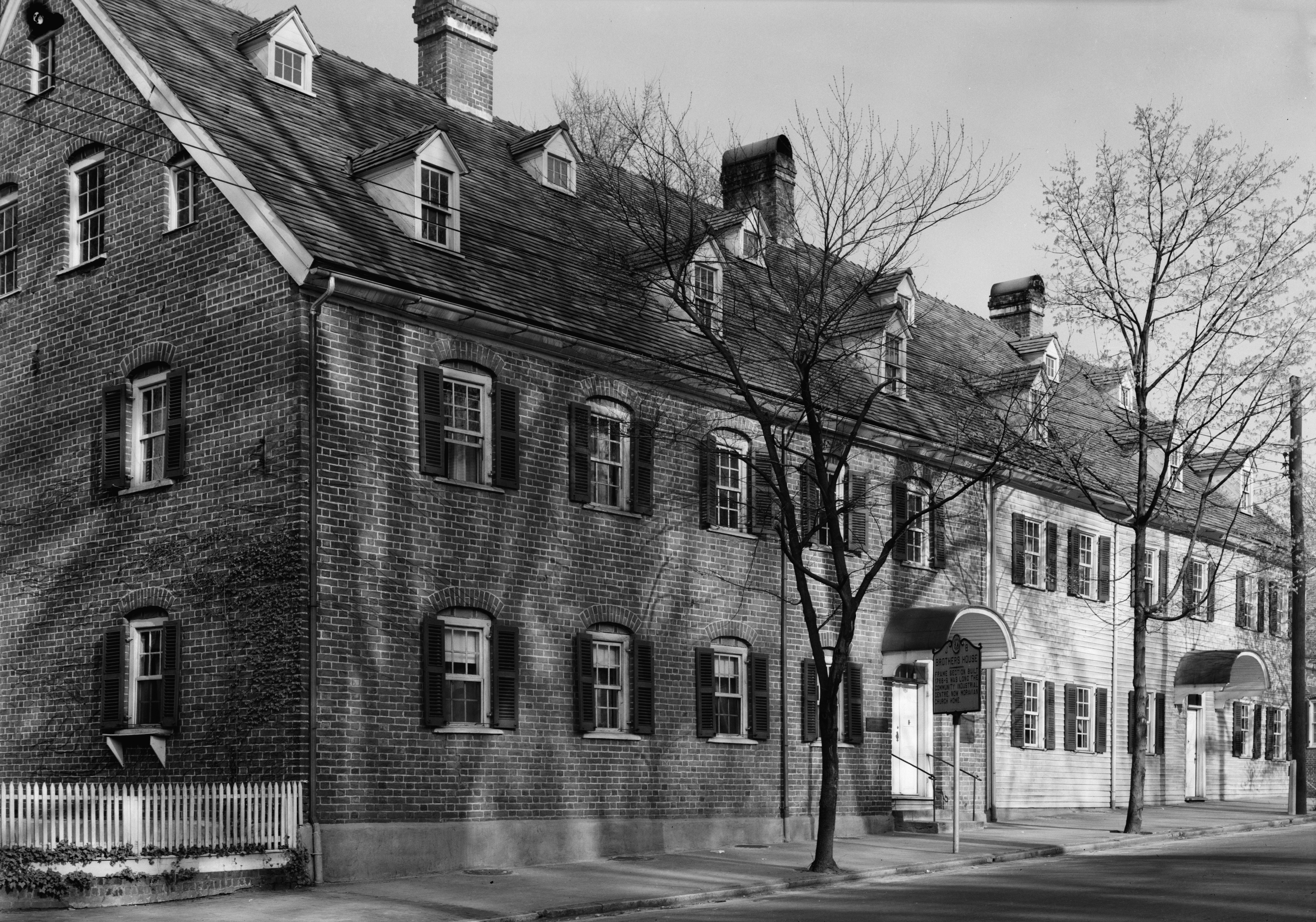
Single Brothers' House, HABS Photo, 1940

== See also ==
- List of the oldest buildings in North Carolina
- List of National Historic Landmarks in North Carolina
- National Register of Historic Places listings in Forsyth County, North Carolina
