= Lucy Bramlette Patterson =

American writer (1865–1942)

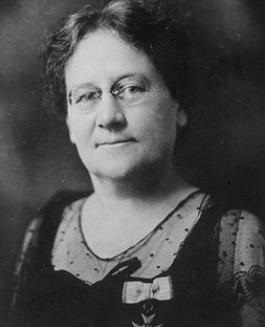
- Born: August 22, 1865; Tazewell, Tennessee
- Died: June 20, 1942 (aged 76); Winston-Salem, North Carolina

Lucy Bramlette Patterson (August 22, 1865 – June 20, 1942) was a committee woman, author, and activist. She is most known for the Patterson Memorial Cup, an award she presented annually for literary achievement. She earned her diploma from the Salem Academy and served as president of the Southern Women's Interstate Association for the Betterment of Public Schools.

== Early life ==
Lucy Bramlette Patterson was born on August 22, 1865. She was born in her mother’s family home in Tazewell, Tennessee. Patterson had one older sister.

== Education ==
In 1892, Patterson graduated from Salem Academy, which her mother had also attended. She was the first woman in her family to receive a diploma.

She began writing literary articles, which was a family tradition. She used her writing talent to make a career for herself. In 1902 she was president of the academy's alumnae association.

== Career ==
She began her career working for The Progressive Farmer. She also wrote for the Charlotte Observer when she filled in for a columnist during his vacation; as a result, there is an article about her in The Journal of American History. Patterson's column in the Journal Sentinel, "Just One and Another", contains her common themes of women's rights in business, politics, and the arts and sciences.

She may be best remembered for her annual award for literary achievement in the state of North Carolina, called the Memorial Cup.

During World War I, Patterson went into the Balkans and wrote about her experiences. Her writings show that she was close with Queen Maria and her family in Romania. Later she was recognized by King Alexander of Yugoslavia for her accomplishments in Serbia. She was also honored as part of Kola Sestara, a group that helped with wartime relief and orphans.

She was the president of the Southern Women's Interstate Association of the Betterment of Public Schools in 1907, and spoke at the Pinehurst about these concerns. She also became a chairman for the Interstate Boone Trail Association, when helped finish the Daniel Boone trail that ran through Tennessee to Kentucky. She volunteered for Forsyth Moonlight, which helped train adults for education as teachers, and offered adult education itself. She served on the Jamestown historical commissions.

== Personal life ==
Lucy Patterson was the daughter of Colonel William Houston and Cornelia Humes Graham Patterson. Her grandfather was Major General Robert Patterson, who served in the War of 1812, the Mexican–American War, and the Civil War.

While attending school in Salem she met a lawyer with the same last name, who was not related to her: Jesse Linsday Patterson. He had just finished first in his class at Davidson College. They were married on September 6, 1888. The two had no children, but adopted their two orphaned nieces.

Aside from writing, Patterson's hobbies included traveling. She traveled to Egypt as a young girl, and later visited Egypt and Moscow.

== Legacy ==
Patterson left behind many awards in her name, including an award for female writers, the Patterson Memorial Cup. 13 writers received this award from 1905 to 1933, and the award is still given today. Its name was changed to the Mayflower Society Cup, it is still given in her honor.
