= Steinbach (Taunus) =

- Town
- Flag Coat of arms

- Location of Steinbach within Hochtaunuskreis district
- Interactive map of Steinbach
- Location within Germany Location within Hesse
- Coordinates: 50°10′N 8°34′E
- Country: Germany
- State: Hesse
- Admin. region: Darmstadt
- District: Hochtaunuskreis

Government
  - Mayor (2019–25): Steffen Bonk (CDU)

Area
  - Total: 4.4 km^{2} (1.7 sq mi)
- Elevation: 150–200 m (490–660 ft)

Population (2025-12-31)
  - Total: 10,827
  - Density: 2,500/km^{2} (6,400/sq mi)
- Time zone: UTC+01:00 (CET)
  - Summer (DST): UTC+02:00 (CEST)
- Postal codes: 61449
- Dialling codes: 06171
- Vehicle registration: HG, USI
- Website: www.stadt-steinbach.de

Steinbach (Taunus) (German pronunciation: [ˈʃtaɪnbax]) is a town in the Hochtaunuskreis that borders Frankfurt am Main to the east. Other neighbouring towns are Oberursel, Kronberg im Taunus and Eschborn. It is in the German state of Hesse.

== Geography ==
=== Location ===
Steinbach lies at a height of 166 metres above sea level in the hills of the Anterior Taunus and on the edge of the Taunus Nature Park. It is about 7 km from Frankfurt's city boundary and 7.5 km southwest of Bad Homburg vor der Höhe. The mountains of Altkönig (798 m) and Feldberg (879 m) to the northwest are within the line of sight. Under clear conditions, the Odenwald can be distinguished in the southwest. To the south is the Frankfurt skyline and, under a sunny weather, the Staudinger power station in Großkrotzenburg can be seen.

=== Neighbouring communities ===
Steinbach is bordered in the north by the town of Oberursel, in the east by the district-free city of Frankfurt, in the south by the town of Eschborn (Main-Taunus-Kreis), and in the west by the town of Kronberg.

=== Geology ===
The town is surrounded by large areas of open land. In the southeast lies the valley of the Steinbach, which empties into the Nidda at Praunheim, and which is a protected landscape. The western region scattered orchards and field hedges is part of a high-priority area for nature and landscape. Toward the northwest lies the forest of Steinbach Heath.

=== Description ===
The old village was originally a circular village, whose houses were clustered in a region of 100 metres around the old wells at the "Pijnacker place". The local wells ("Bütt") provided the residents with a source of fresh water (the water pipe was only installed in 1954 - at the same time as the gas lines - after Steinbach joined the Upper Taunus district. Predictions supplied by the single-house-wells or water was by hand-pumps from a running well.) From the square, still lower and Kirchgasse and Bornhohl - in the upper lane extension -.

=== Neighbours ===
- N: Taunus, Altkönig, Feldberg
- NE: Oberursel, Bad Homburg
- E: Oberursel-Stierstadt, Oberursel-Weißkirchen, S-Bahnhof
- SE: Frankfurt am Main (Niederursel, Praunheim)
- S: Frankfurt (Sossenheim, Rödelheim), Eschborn-Süd
- SW: Eschborn
- W: Niederhöchstadt, Schwalbach, Main-Taunus-Kreis
- NW: Kronberg, Oberhöchstadt

== Coat of arms ==
Steinbach's civic coat of arms shows a harnessed spring with two spouts out of both of which is coming water, pouring into a vat. This heraldic charge is based on an actual spring that can be found at Pijnacker Square in the town.

Steinbach was granted these arms in 1964, and their origin is wholly modern, as the town had never had arms until this time, at least as far as was known. The vat originally surrounded the spring and served to hold the water for those who needed it. This struck some as rather an odd sight, and it earned the town the nickname Steinbach in der Bütt (Bütt, or more usually Bütte, being German for "vat").

== History ==
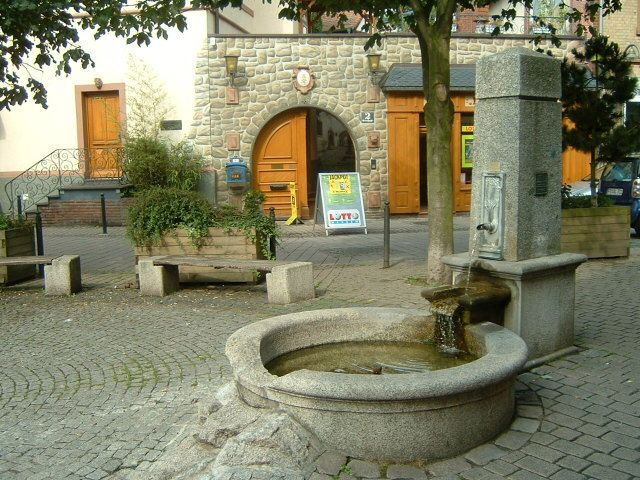
The Steinbach Spring at Pijnacker Square

Steinbach had its first documentary mention in 789 in the codex traditionum: "The Marca Steinbach goes as a donation to the Lorsch Benedictine Monastery".

The Protestant Church of St. George Steinbach belonged to the Archbishopric of Mainz and was built around 1270. But the oldest written reference dates from the year 1371, as the knight Frank von Kronberg bequeathed 40 guilders for their building maintenance in his will. Since 1367 Steinbach has belonged to the parish of Eschborn. Ecclesiastical Middle Authority was the Archdeacon of the provost of St. Peter in Mainz.

From 1866 to 1945, Steinbach was a Hessian island within otherwise Prussian territory in the Anterior Taunus (the part of the Taunus nearest Frankfurt): As the only community in Frankfurt's west, it belonged not to the Prussian-occupied Duchy of Nassau but to the Offenbach district in the Grand Duchy of Hesse, and as of the 1918 Revolution to the People's State of Hesse. Until 1945, therefore, the community bordered on "foreign" territory at every compass point.

Out of this community grew a small town – which only 50 years earlier did not even have 1000 inhabitants – when in 1972 Steinbach was granted town rights after municipal reform.

== Sights ==
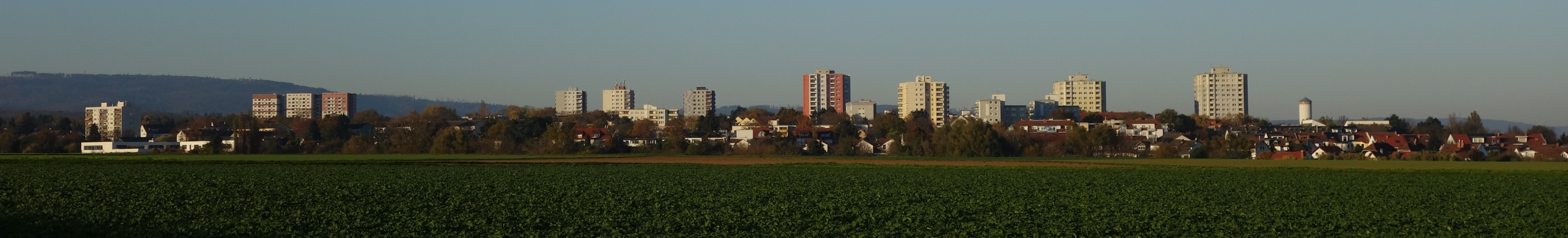
View of Steinbach from the south

Steinbach is part of the urban area "Rhein-Main-Gebiet". It doesn't have many historic buildings, but here is a small Overview: In the heart of Steinbach stone on the court Pijnacker: Here is the symbol "Bütt", a well run, jump out of the Steinbach fed. Framed this is the center of the two inns "Zum Goldenen Stern" and "Zum Schwanen", with its monumental timbered facade. Both bars have a very long tradition. The oldest restaurant in Steinbach "Zum Taunus" in the Bornhohl no longer exists. In the Kirchgasse, is the back house, nor by the old custom of baking bread itself. The back rooms of the house, but also for various exhibitions and lectures. There is also a "Trauzimmer". The St. George's Church (Protestant) is next to the back house. It was built 1537 as the first Protestant church in Germany at the direction of Caspar Kronberg of the second century. In Steinbach, there are some old buildings, by the bronze plates on the Built and other important details to report, such as the old "Schultheißenhaus" in "Bornhohl", which was first documented in 1549 as a house of "Schultheißenamtes" was mentioned in today monument. Interesting and historically valuable is the house Untergasse 2 by 1782 to 1856 Johann Christoph Diehl lived, the teacher from Frederick Stolze. A bronze plate reminiscent of the former Steinbacher. Change of location: The first of the Oak Forest City Steinbacher is a tree monument. It is the most southerly of the Taunus oak.

Bells of St. George's Church

In the small, pointed turrets of St. George's Church are two bells. The oldest, the St. George bell from the year 1622 (still from the 30-year war) has a weight of 250 pounds and is in the tone "dis". Their inscription reads "I poured Joh Andr. Schneiderwin Frankfurdt 1622. The other, which John Bell poured on 2 December 1956 by Gebr Rinker in mind weighs 220 pounds and is on the sound "f". It was created by the longtime pastor Martin Tuber consecrated.

== Population development ==
| Year | Population |
|---|---|
| 1535 | 31 |
| 1750 | 220 |
| 1853 | 600 |
| 1945 | 1492 |
| 1960 | 1713 |
| 1965 | 4089 |
| 1975 | 10642 |
| 1985 | 10440 |
| 2007 | 10005 |

== Economy ==
Steinbach has at its disposal a 14-hectare industrial park.

=== Transport ===
Steinbach is distinguished by not having a direct road link to Frankfurt. Through Oberursel-Weißkirchen/Steinbach station, however, it is joined to the RMV S-Bahn network. The bigger towns of Oberursel, Bad Homburg vor der Höhe and Frankfurt am Main can be reached on line S5.

Two buslines connect the town core and outlying residential neighbourhoods with the railway station on the Homburger Bahn and with neighbouring places.

A few kilometres away are interchanges with Autobahnen A 5 and A 66.

Frankfurt International Airport is 15 km away.

=== Educational institutions ===
Steinbach is home to the Geschwister-Scholl-Grundschule, a primary school named after Hans and Sophie Scholl, a brother and sister who were part of the White Rose resistance group in Nazi Germany.

== Notable people ==
- Christian Gottlieb Reuter, architect

== Partnerships ==
Steinbach maintains partnership links with the following places:

- Pijnacker, Netherlands
- Saint-Avertin, France
- (Germany) Steinbach-Hallenberg, Thuringia
