= Muiželis Manor =

Manor in Latvia

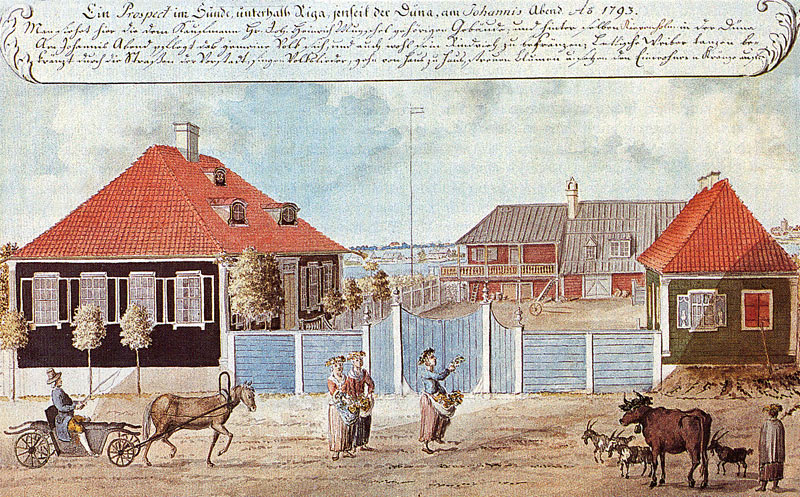
- Jāņi Eve by Muiželis Manor in 1793
- Interactive map of the Muiželis Manor area

General information
- Status: total loss
- Architectural style: Baroque
- Coordinates: 56°57′26″N 24°04′20″E

Muiželis Manor was a Baroque styled building in Latvia built for Muižeļi Family of Pārdaugava manor in 18th and 19th century, however the building was not preserved to the present day. It was located between Zunds and Daugavgrīvas streets, on modern Ūdens street of the northern side. The Muižeļi family lived in Daugava's Zunds since 17th century, Muižeļi were engaged in various occupations, including selling timber to England and other countries. By the end of 18th century, the Muižeļi family owned nine land plots.

== History ==
The first known owner of the manor was Ansis Muiželis of Daugava's ferries and his son Albrecht Muiželis. Albrecht's first wife was Johann Steinhauer's sister Anna. Later the manor was owned by Albrecht's son - John Heinrich Muiželis, a merchant of Riga's second guild and court judge of Conscience. They also gave birth to Karl Justus Davis Muiželis, who became a professor of veterinary medicine at Vilnius University. In the late 18th century John Heinrich liquidated his company and purchased the estate in Vitebsk province, then moved to Vilnius province. The manor was inherited by his trade companion, an elder brother of Albrecht Muiželis from the first merchant guild.

Napoleonic Wars caused blockades and the Muiželis family business suffered during the French invasion of Russia. After 1812, the manor was sold to Albrecht Muižeļis' assistant for 3000 silver rubles, the mast selector John Mesters' daughter - Juliana Frederick, because of her heritage the court invested into Muiželis' companies. Juliana was married to the civil governor's secretary from the Governorate of Livonia - J. von Meyer. After Meyer's death in 1841, the manor was passed to Riga's merchant A. M. Gorohova's property.

== Description ==
The ornate baroque manor had one floor, tiled roof with roof windows on second floor, log fence and the three-part gate. The ranch has been painted in bright colors. One of the first Latvian luxurious manors in Riga. The residential manor had a black facade with white highlighted details. The dwelling manor was painted in shades of green with carefully painted insides of the shutters - it was decorated with paintings of a vase and festoons. The household facade was painted in "Swedish red", detailed light. This manor was different from the other Latvian houses in Pārdaugava.
