= Home Moravian Church =

Moravian church in North Carolina, US

Coordinates: 36°5′16.1″N 80°14′28.4″W

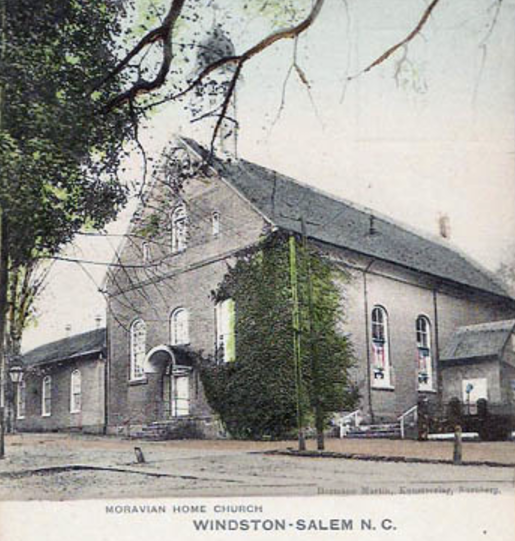
Moravian Home Church, Winston-Salem, North Carolina, from a pre-1907 postcard

Home Moravian Church is a Moravian church located in Old Salem, North Carolina. The church was founded on November 13, 1771, in what was then the Province of North Carolina. Its burial ground, God's Acre Cemetery, is located around 100 yards (91 m) to the north.

The church is visited by tourists and historians. It conducts weekly services.
