= Bethabara Moravian Church =

Historic church in North Carolina, US

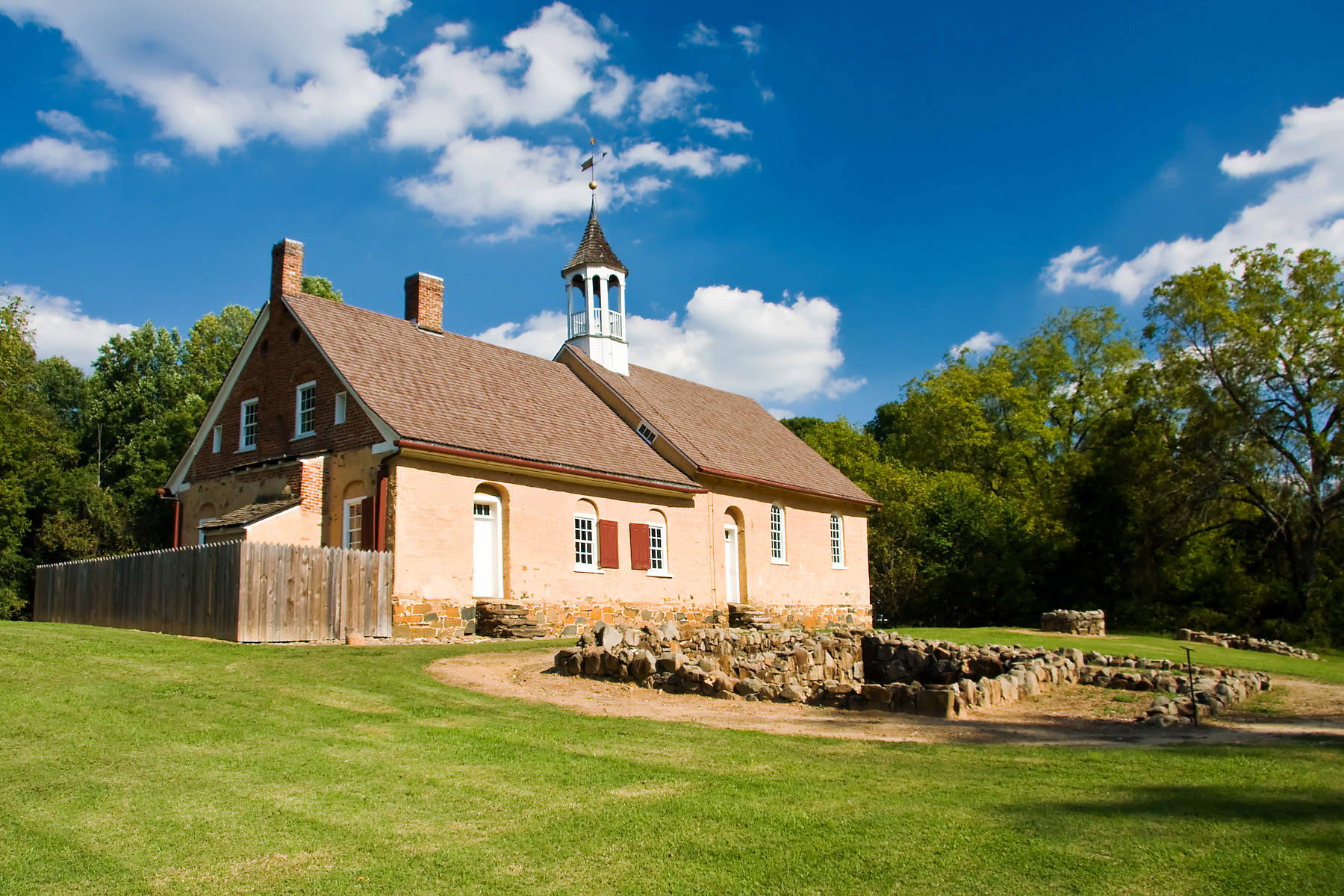
- 1788 Bethabara Gemeinhaus (2008)
- Bethabara Moravian Church
- Location: Winston-Salem, North Carolina, USA
- Denomination: Moravian Church, Southern Province
- Website: https://www.bethabara.org/

History
- Founded: November 17, 1753

Bethabara Moravian Church is a Protestant congregation of the Moravian Church located in Winston-Salem, North Carolina. Founded as the first Moravian settlement in North Carolina on November 17, 1753, Bethabara served as the center of Moravian work in the South until 1766. The Bethabara Historic District, including the Historic Church, were declared a National Historic Landmark in 1999.

The congregation is still active, meeting in an updated building at 2100 Bethabara Road.

What remains of the historic Bethabara settlement is maintained by the City of Winston-Salem.

== 1788 Gemeinhaus ==
- Bethabara Moravian Gemeinhaus
- U.S. National Register of Historic Places
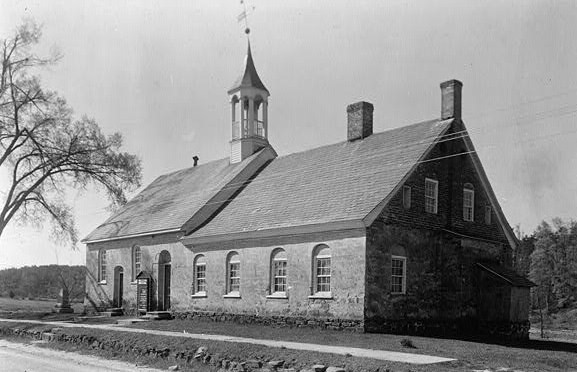
- 1934

- Location within North Carolina Location within the United States
- Location: 2147 Bethabara Rd., Winston-Salem, North Carolina
- Coordinates: 36°9′11.99″N 80°18′1.04″W
- Built: 1788
- Architect: Frederick William Marshall
- Part of: Bethabara Historic District (ID78001948)
- NRHP reference No.: 71000586
- Added to NRHP: September 28, 1971

Built in 1788, in what is now Winston-Salem, North Carolina, the Bethabara Gemeinhaus (German for community house) served as the house of worship and meeting place for the Bethabara community until the 1950's. Designed by Moravian administrator Friedrich Wilhelm von Marschall, it was listed on the National Register of Historic Places in 1971. The historic church is located at 2147 Bethabara Road.
