= Heidersdorf =

- Municipality
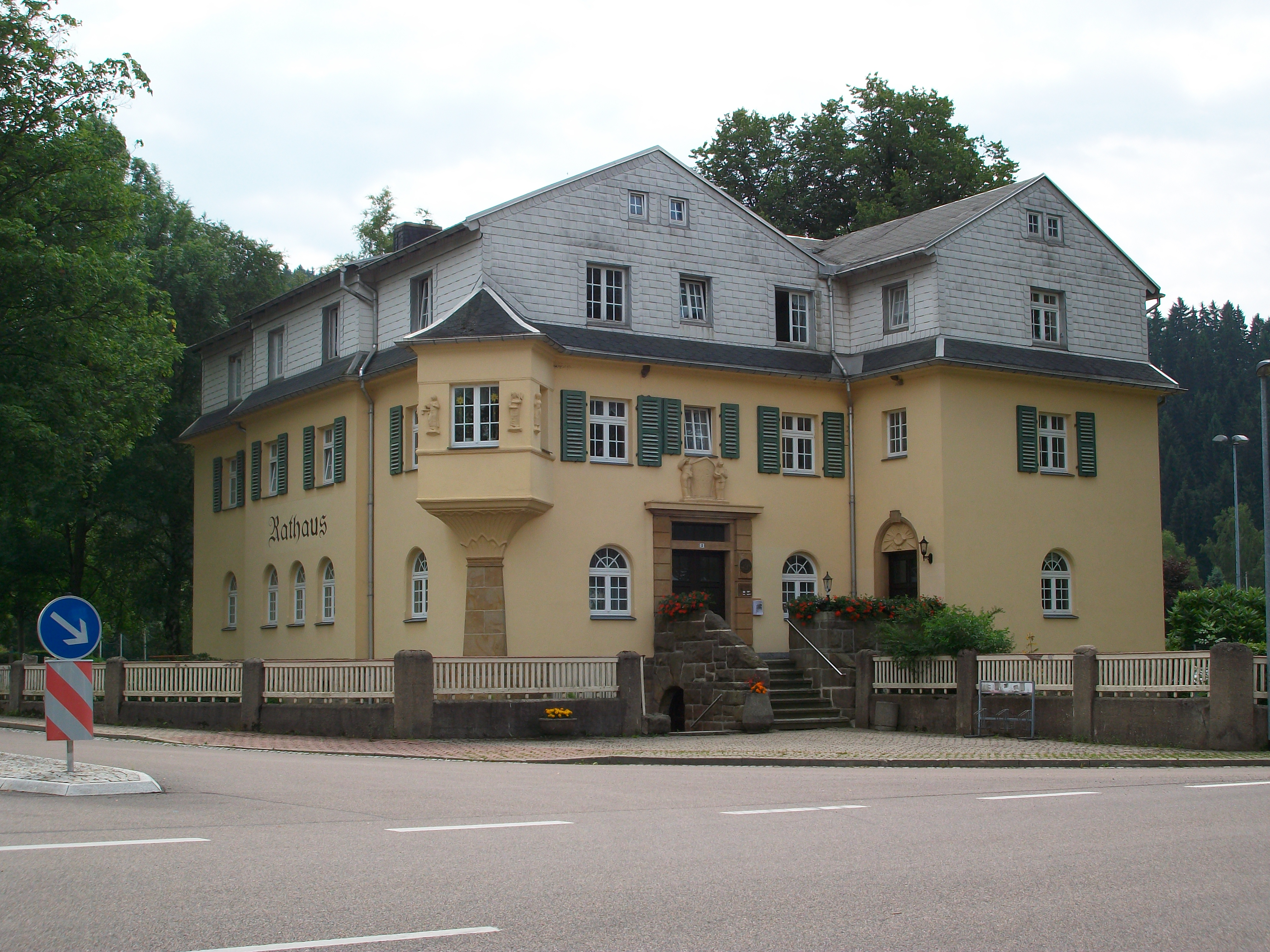
- Town hall

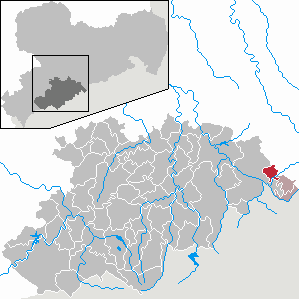
- Location of Heidersdorf within Erzgebirgskreis district
- Interactive map of Heidersdorf
- Location within Germany Location within Saxony
- Coordinates: 50°41′N 13°24′E
- Country: Germany
- State: Saxony
- District: Erzgebirgskreis

Government
  - Mayor (2022–29): Andreas Börner

Area
  - Total: 9.49 km^{2} (3.66 sq mi)
- Elevation: 593 m (1,946 ft)

Population (2025-12-31)
  - Total: 732
  - Density: 77.1/km^{2} (200/sq mi)
- Time zone: UTC+01:00 (CET)
  - Summer (DST): UTC+02:00 (CEST)
- Postal codes: 09526
- Dialling codes: 037361
- Vehicle registration: ERZ, ANA, ASZ, AU, MAB, MEK, STL, SZB, ZP
- Website: heidersdorf.de

Heidersdorf is a municipality in the district Erzgebirgskreis, in Saxony, Germany.

== Notable people ==
- Gottfried Aust, master potter, was born in Heidersdorf in 1722
