= Christian Triebel =

German master carpenter (1714–1798)

- Born: 6 November 1714; Germany
- Died: 16 April 1798 (aged 83); Salem, North Carolina, U.S.
- Resting place: God's Acre Cemetery

Christian Triebel (6 November 1714 – 16 April 1798) was a German master carpenter. He helped build several notable buildings in the Moravian community in today's Winston-Salem and Old Salem, North Carolina, and elsewhere in the state. These buildings are some of the few that have survived. One of his most notable works is the Single Brothers' House, which was completed in 1769.

== Early life ==
Triebel was born in Germany in 1714 and grew up in Henneberg. In his memoir, he stated he was a rambunctious youth, but after beginning an affiliation with the Moravian Church, he lived a pious life.

== Career ==
In 1754, Rasp emigrated to Bethlehem in the Pennsylvania Colony. He moved shortly thereafter to Wachovia, Province of North Carolina, around the same time as master stonemason Melchior Rasp, arriving in October 1755.

In January 1766, he was requested to assist in the construction of a new Moravian settlement in Old Salem, North Carolina, beginning with a home for the builders. He was helped by his apprentice, Strahle (Strehle).

His final project, in 1786, was the Single Sisters' House.

=== Selected works ===
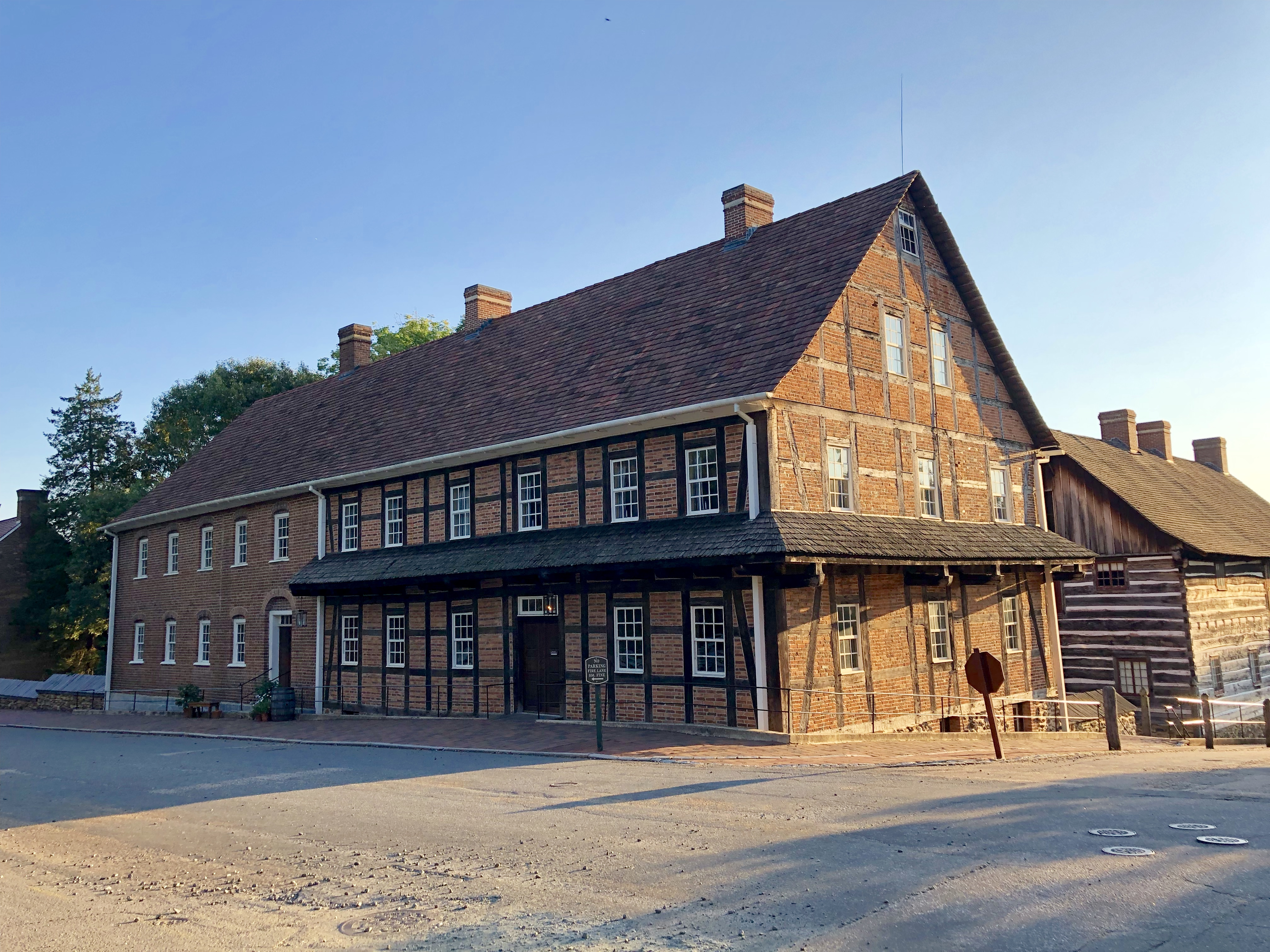
Single Brothers' House, Old Salem, North Carolina

Triebel was partly responsible for the construction of the following buildings:

- Summerhouse, Old Town, North Carolina (1759)
- First House, Winston-Salem, North Carolina (1767)
- Single Brothers' House, Old Salem, North Carolina (1769)
- Single Sisters' House, Old Salem, North Carolina (1786)

== Personal life ==
Triebel built his home, at the corner of Academy Street and Main Street in Old Salem, in 1774. Part of the agreement with the Congregational Council, who owned the lot, was that he would allow the night watchmen to occupy an upstairs room.

In October 1778, Triebel broke his leg while working on a mill in Bethabara (now Winston-Salem). The injury restricted him for the rest of his life. He retired around 1787.

== Death ==
Triebel died in 1798, aged 83. He is interred in Salem Moravian God's Acre in Winston-Salem.
