= Salem Academy =

American Girl's boarding school in North Carolina

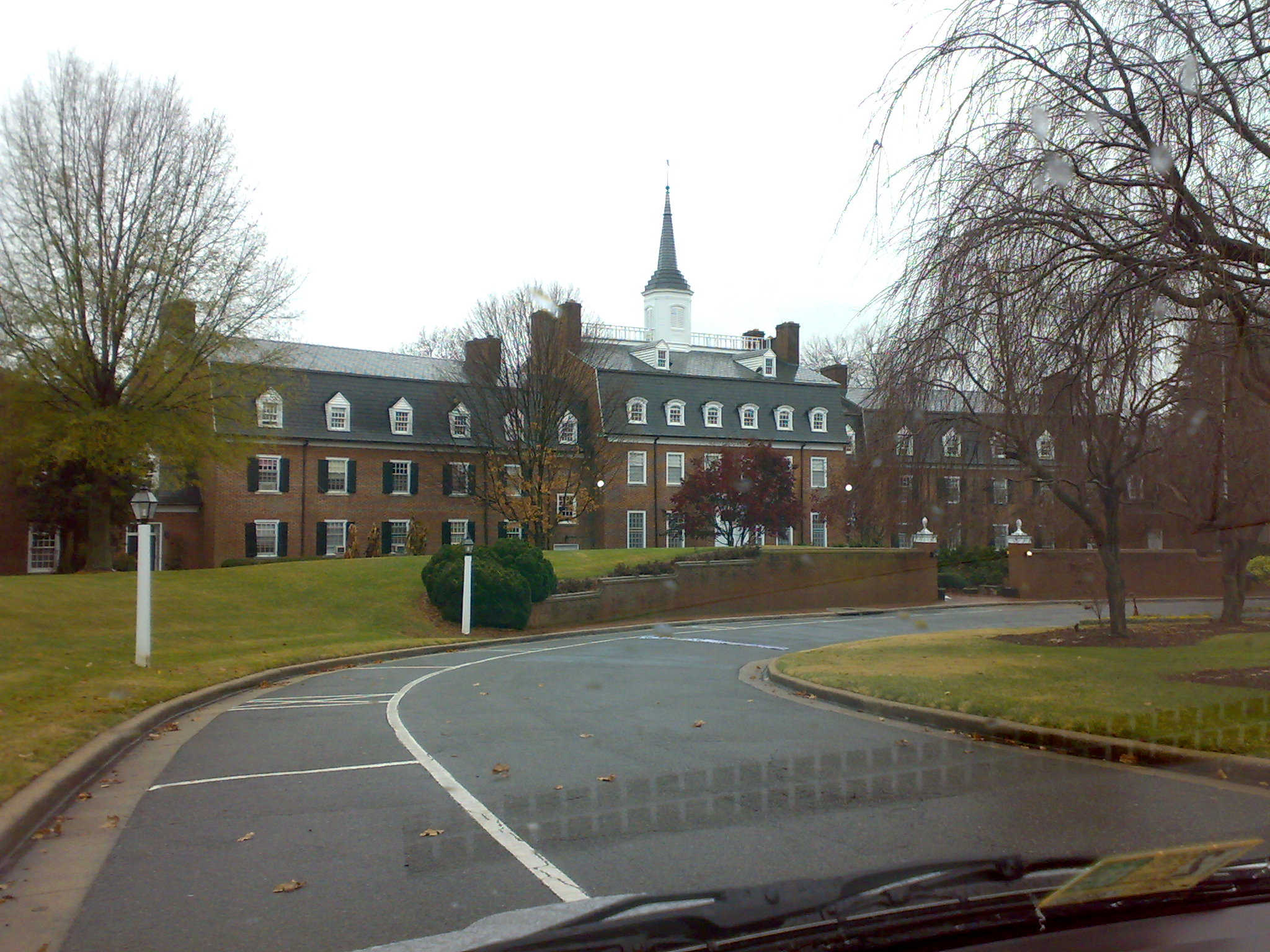

Location
- 500 Salem Avenue; Winston-Salem, North Carolina 27101; United States; 36°05′15″N 80°14′21″W

Information
- Type: Private; college-preparatory; day; boarding school
- Motto: The Beginning of Possible
- Established: 1772 (254 years ago)
- CEEB code: 344455
- Head of school: Kris Sorrells
- Faculty: 45
- Grades: 9–12
- Gender: All-Girls
- Enrollment: About 200
- Campus: Suburban
- Colors: Purple and gold
- Athletics: North Carolina Independent Schools Athletic Association (NCISAA)
- Team name: Sabers
- School fees: graduation: $175
- Tuition: Day students: $29,520; Boarding students: $46,900–$55,930
- Website: salemacademy.com

Salem Academy is a boarding and day school for high school girls in Winston-Salem, North Carolina. It shares its campus with Salem College, located near historic Old Salem. It is the oldest private school in North Carolina, and the fourth-oldest boarding school in the United States.

== History ==
Salem was founded in 1772 by early Moravian settlers who held the view that girls deserved an education comparable to that afforded boys. Among the town's early residents were 16 girls and women who traveled, mostly on foot, around 500 miles from Bethlehem, Province of Pennsylvania, to join the new community. One of them was 17-year-old Elisabeth Oesterlein, who founded and became the first teacher of what is now Salem Academy and College. There were very few girls' schools at the time, particularly in the South. Word quickly spread about the girls' school, and the school accepted boarding students in 1802. The school grew considerably throughout the 19th century, both in size and course offerings, with college-level courses being offered in the 1860s. As the college-level curriculum expanded, the school officially became known as Salem Academy and College in 1907. Despite such travails as the American Civil War and a measles epidemic in the 1800s, the Academy has never closed its doors in the more than two centuries since those first classes were held.

== Affiliation ==
Founded by the Moravian Church, Salem Academy is now an independent institution which retains some of the traditions of the church. Other Moravian traditions still practiced at the school include the senior vespers, held at the end of every fall term, which includes a Moravian Lovefeast.

Salem Academy is a member of the National Association of Independent Schools and is fully accredited by the Southern Association of Colleges and Schools.

== Admissions ==
Salem accepts students from all over the United States and from around the world. All U.S. applicants are required to send middle-school transcripts and teacher recommendations, and must take the Secondary School Admission Test (SSAT). International applicants may submit TOEFL or TOEFL, Jr. scores as an alternate to the SSAT. Applicants are also required to undergo an interview before being admitted.

International students from countries such as Germany, South Korea, Trinidad, Albania, Dominica, Lithuania, the United Kingdom, the Bahamas, and China make up nearly one-quarter of the student body each school year.

== Academics ==
Salem Academy offers a college preparatory curriculum, and 100 percent of Salem Academy students continue their education in college. Students are accepted at many of the top colleges and universities in the United States and around the world.

The Class of 2017 had a 100 percent college acceptance rate and earned more than $3 million in scholarship offers.

=== Requirements ===
Salem requires 20 academic credits required for graduation, including four in English, three in a world language, four in mathematics, three in history, and three in science, plus requirements in physical education, religion, and fine arts.

=== Jan Term ===
Jan Term is a three-week mini-term that gives students opportunities to pursue internships, enroll in special classes, and travel both in the United States and abroad. The school schedules trips each year that are organized and led by faculty members from different departments. For the first two years most students spend January Term on campus in focused classes or programs that allow each student to further explore her interests. Juniors and Seniors pursue internships outside of Salem where they can gain first hand knowledge of topics and careers of interest.

== Athletics ==
=== Teams ===
Salem Academy's students participate in many different sports alongside their academic activities.

During the fall season, the offered sports include: varsity and junior-varsity: field hockey, volleyball, tennis, and cross country.

In the winter season, varsity swimming, basketball, and fencing are offered.

And in the spring, varsity soccer, and varsity track and field are the offered sports.

The school mascot is the saber, and the school colors are purple and gold.

=== Athletic events ===
In February, the Athletic Council holds a bonfire where students gather around a large fire on the athletic fields to roast hotdogs, make smores, and drink hot chocolate.

== Traditions ==
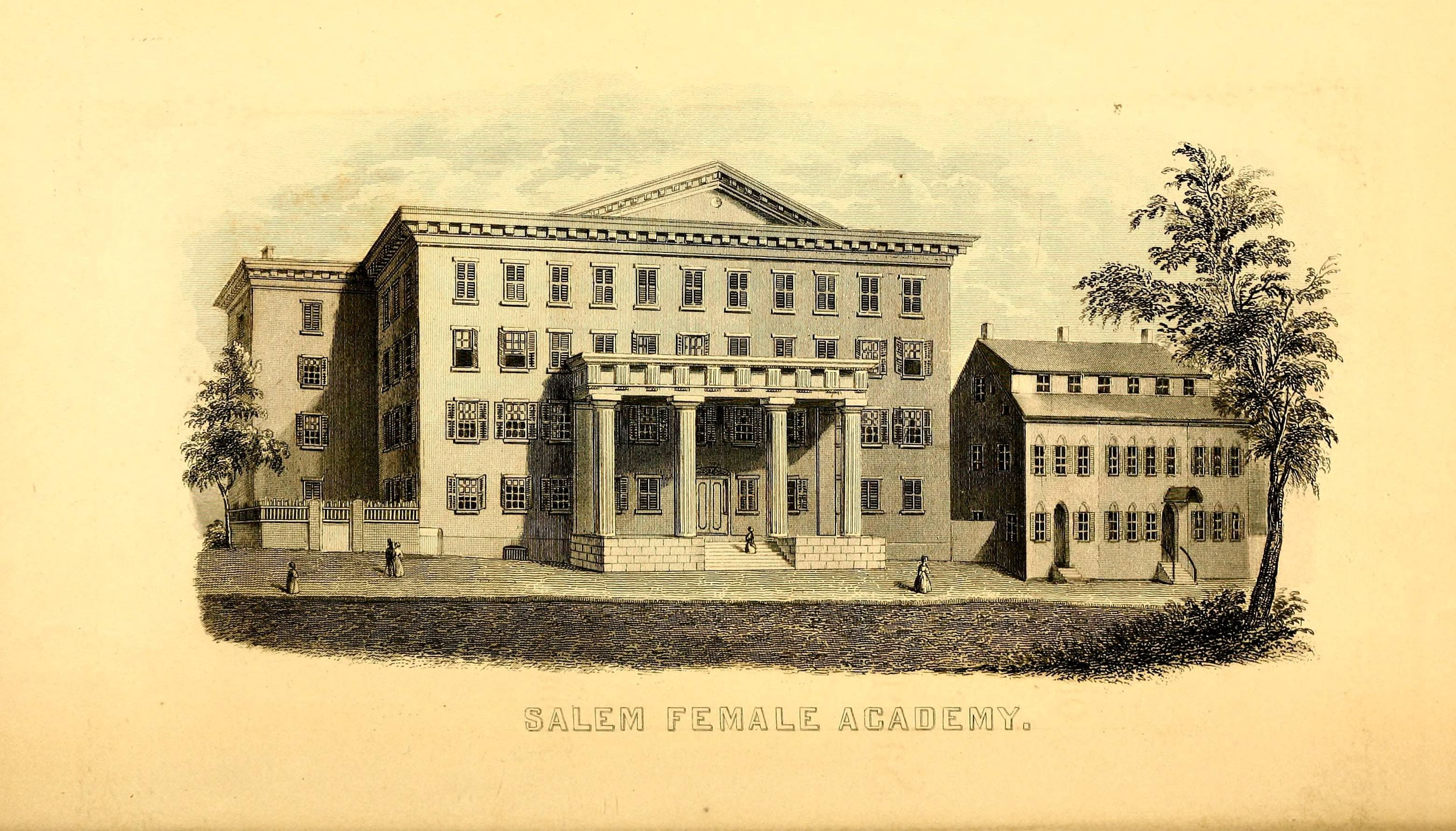
Salem Female Academy Catalogs (1854-1872)(page 172)

=== Opening Chapel ===
Each fall the school year officially begins at Opening Chapel. The ceremony involves faculty and staff sharing personal messages and the Dean of Students reading letters from alumnae with well wishes and advice for current students. Alumnae from classes as far back as 1930 attend and are recognized by the current students.

=== Smoosh Cake Banquet ===
Smoosh Cake Banquet is a tradition for Salem Academy. Seniors are each given a cupcake. Inside each cupcake are small gems that "foretell" that student's future.

=== Athletic Picnic ===
The school colors are purple and gold and the entire school is divided into two school spirit teams—the purple team and the gold team. Each year the new students learn which team they will be on at the Athletic Picnic, held in the fall. The athletic picnic includes games and displays of school spirit on the front lawn.

=== Ring Banquet ===
Ring banquet is held in the fall. Freshman host an evening with a secret theme that only they know. This is when seniors run down an aisle to receive their class rings. The presidents of both the Freshman and Senior classes, along with a previously elected Freshman prepare speeches and speak to the crowd.

=== Senior Day ===
Senior Day is held the day after the Ring Banquet. In the morning, the seniors are entertained by the faculty and staff at a special breakfast. During the day the seniors, divided in groups, teach brief seminars to the younger students on the topic of their choice, ranging from origami to cupcake decorating to the philosophy of "The Office." The morning is concluded by the seniors acting out skits and singing the senior song to the other students, faculty, and staff during an outdoor luncheon. Starting with the Class of 2008, if the seniors wish to mention a teacher in the skit, they must ask for the approval of the mentioned teacher, due to past incidents of faculty members feeling insulted by the content of the skits. Senior skits portray what their four years were like, highlight ongoing inside class jokes, and remember the most absurd events their class experienced together.

=== Senior Vespers ===
Senior Vespers is a cherished Christmas event that marks the close of the fall semester. The seniors lead a Moravian Lovefeast, which is a candlelight choral service in which students sing Christmas carols and seniors serve coffee and buns in the Moravian tradition. Seniors wear white dresses and are not allowed to speak for the duration of the ceremony

== Notable faculty/alumnae ==
- Elizabeth Campbell (1902–2004) — founded WETA-TV
- Marshall Chapman (born 1949) — singer-songwriter
- Nancy Bryan Faircloth (1930–2010), philanthropist
- Tillie Kidd Fowler (1942–2005) — member of the U.S. House of Representatives from Florida's 4th congressional district
- Vivian Howard (born 1978) — chef and television personality
- Sarah T. Hughes (1896–1985) — US District Court Judge, swore in President Lyndon B. Johnson following President John F. Kennedy's assassination, only woman to ever swear in a US President.
- Lena B. Mathes (1861-1951), educator, clergy, and temperance reformer
- Lucy Bramlette Patterson (1865–1942) — committee woman, author, activist
- Sarah Childress Polk (1803–1891) — First Lady of the United States; wife of President James K. Polk
- Adrian Harrold Wood — educator, writer and author of the blog Tales of an Educated Debutante
- Rolonda Watts — actress, producer, and television and radio talk show host
