= Friedrich von Marschall =

German Moravian leader active in North Carolina (1721–1802)

Friedrich Wilhelm von Marschall (5 February 1721 – 11 February 1802), commonly known in the USA as Frederic William Marshall, was a German Moravian administrator, town-planner, and architect in North Carolina.

== Life in Europe ==
Born to Electoral Saxon army officer Georg Rudolph von Marschall and his wife in Stolpen, Upper Lusatia, Holy Roman Empire of the German Nation, von Marschall studied at universities in Leipzig and Herrnhaag before joining the Moravian Unity of Brethren in 1739. Traveling to England on behalf of the church, Marschall became involved in parliamentary proceedings culminating in the act of Parliament, the Settlement of Moravians in America Act 1748 (22 Geo. 2. c. 30), which endorsed Moravian settlement in the American colonies.

== Leadership of Moravian settlement in Salem, North Carolina ==
The Moravians appointed von Marschall Senior Civilis (1761), Agent for the Unity in North Carolina, and Oeconomus of Wachovia, the large Moravian settlement in North Carolina (1763).

The French and Indian War delayed his arrival until 1764, whereupon he began planning the central town for the territory, Salem. Construction began in 1766, and by 1772 Salem had a thriving community, the result of von Marschall's excellent designs. However, problems began to arise: with unchecked power in the settlement, von Marschall was able to deny plots to non-Moravians, and in 1771 the regulator movement accused the Moravians of illegally occupying the land, but von Marschall saw this as only a ruse to test the Moravians' determination and charges were averted. He was elected as a member of the American Philosophical Society in 1771.

When the Revolutionary War began, the Moravians felt trapped in neutrality, reluctant to sever ties to their brethren in England, yet already on thin ice with their fellow Americans. The Confiscation Act of 1777 proved a greater threat: to protect Wachovia, von Marschall returned from the Moravian Synod in Germany where he had been since 1775 to become a trustee of the territory. From then on, von Marschall remained dedicated to the settlement, making frequent visits to the General Assembly to defend Moravian claims and continuing to design buildings and institutions for Salem.

== Death and legacy ==
He died in a thriving Salem, remembered as the father of his community and a religious leader to Moravians and non-Moravians alike.

Lehigh University library holds a collection of his papers.
