= Johann Steinhauer =

Latvian civil rights activist and businessman

- Born: Jānis Akmeņkalis; 19 January 1705; Riga, Latvia
- Died: 21 February 1779 (aged 74); Riga, Latvia
- Occupations: Entrepreneur, Industrialist and Businessman
- Known for: First Latvian industrialist and the richest man in Riga in the 18th century; Latvian civil Rights Pioneer
- Title: Masterwracker or crown mast selector
- Spouse: Barbara Baron
- Children: Matthis Steinhauer II, Rev. Johan Steinhauer III, Daniel Steinhauer, Barbara "Babbe" Wier, Margarethe [Eleonora] Messerschmidt, Anne Steinhauer, Elizabeth Steinhauer, Johanna Catherina Schmiedt, Grete Steinhauer, Johanna Magdalena Riegelmann, Martha Maria Schroll, Christiane Willy.

Johann Steinhauer (Latvian: Jānis Šteinhauers, born Jānis Akmeņkalis; 19 January 1705 – 21 February 1779) was a Latvian entrepreneur, social reformer and landowner, who made significant contributions to the Latvian civil rights throughout the 18th century.

== Family ==
Jānis Akmeņkalis was the son of Matīss Akmeņkalis (Germanised as Matthis Steinhauer), a runaway Latvian serf turned into a merchant who transported cargo for the Swedes during the Swedish rule of Riga. He was born about 1680 and emigrated to Riga from Courland at the turn of the century. In 1704 he married Johann's mother Margareta Schugge, a Riga Latvian. "Matthis possessed an exceptional talent for judging the quality of timber and built an international reputation as an assessor of ship's masts".

Between 1703 and 1710 Matthis and mast selector Brinkkis were hired by the Tzar Peter I of Russia to select the wood for the construction of the newly founded city of Saint Petersburg, receiving the title of Royal Mast Selector. He engaged the Unitas Fratrum or Moravian Brethren, becoming one of their most prominent members in Riga, and this would have far lasting consequences in the destinies of his descendants. He had 10 known children all born in St John's parish in Riga.

== Economic success ==
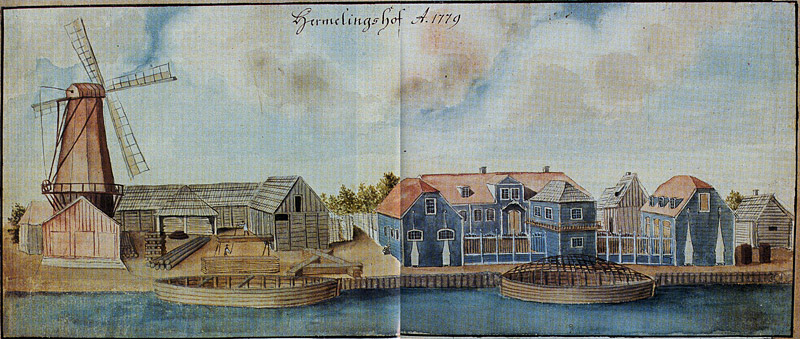
Hermelingshof in 1779.Drawing by Johann Christoph Brotze

Johann Steinhauer became Mast Inspector like his father and accomplished a considerable fortune in a short time. He traded timber and he was known for the quality of his products. He founded a sawmill in Hermelingshof (Hermalina) and the first paper factory in Riga. He owned estates, manors, and land in Riga and the rest of Latvia becoming the wealthiest man in Riga in the 17th century.

Manors and estates that belonged to Johann Steinhauer and his family:

- Sassenhof or Zasumuiža: In Sassenhof he built the First Paper's manufacturing industry. It operated both by wind and water. The mills produced various grades of paper, and raw materials for the Clothing and Printing Industries.
- Hermelingshof: At this manor Steinhauer build a sawmill driven by a windmill that supplied the ships arriving at the port of Riga.
- Möllershof or Mühlenhof by Riga (Zemunda)
- Wohlershof or Voleri at Dünamünde (Daugavgrīva)
- The meadows and grasslands of Spilwen (Spilve, Riga)
- The windmills at Fosa Island
- Aahaken or Bergshof located in the vicinity of Riga. Here he built his own Port (Bolderāja) to transport timber.
- Schlottmachersholm Schlottmaker
- 4000 acres (lot 5 and 13) as Shareholder in the " Der North Carolina Land und Colonie Establissement" (Wachovia, North Carolina)

== Moravian Society ==
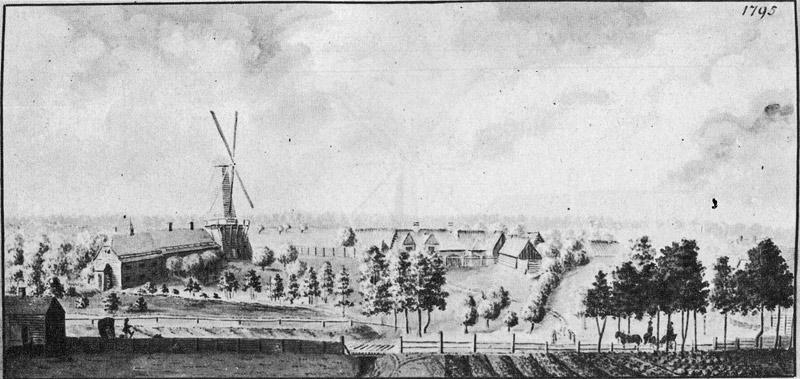
Sassenhof or Zasumuiza manor at the mill in 1795. Drawing by Johann Christoph Brotze

Fascinated by the Brethren's democratic ideals, Matthis Steinhauer became one of its earliest members of the pietist Moravian Church. He became the leader of the Moravian Society in Riga and his home, their meeting place. After his father's death Johann took his place in Riga's Moravian Society, and when the Herrnhuters were outlawed he continued to support the church and its missionary effort in secret. One of his Manors, Sassenhof, became the center for the underground Moravian Church in Riga. In 1754 he bought 4,000 acres (16 km^{2}) in Wachovia (Winston-Salem), North Carolina in support of the Moravian Church efforts to create a Moravian Colony there. This land was later sold to the Moravian Church and colonists who emigrated there. Throughout his live he promoted religious understanding and freedom in Riga.

== Johann Steinhauer versus the Great Guild and the Magistrature of Riga ==
"The case of Steinhauer versus the Great Guild and the Magistrature of Riga was a significant event in the history of race relations in Riga". With time the Steinhauers were able to amass a considerable fortune and own property throughout Riga. However all transactions had to be owned under somebody else's name, because, according to the Statute, only members of the Great Guild had the right to trade and to own property, and membership was refused to them because they were Latvian and of serf origin. In 1747 the Steinhauers brought the case before Riga's Senate but in 1753 it issued its verdict against the appellants. After the Senate's Decision, new restrictions against the Latvians were enacted. The Steinhauers brought their case before the Governor General of Livonia, prince Dolgoruky, who supported them, and eventually the Grand Duke Peter, heir to the Russian Throne, named Johann's brother Daniel commissar of commerce to Schleswig-Holstein, saving their property from confiscation. In 1757 Tobias Georg Efflein (Oeffelein), a German accountant and Daniel's son in law, applied for membership at the Great Guild and was refused on the grounds that he had given no proofs of his standing as a bookkeeper, and that his wife was a Latvian. In 1757 the Senate's previous ruling was dismissed, under the auspices of Katherina the Great, and ordered the Guild to accept his membership. The senate ruling had far reaching consequences for it established the right of any worthy inhabitant of Riga, regardless of national origin, to trade and own property in Riga.

== Legacy ==
Johann Steinhauer's entrepreneurial successes, his efforts to bring about the right of ownership and freedom of worship on behalf of the native Latvians and serfs had far reaching consequences. At the time of his birth native Latvians and serfs were a stagnant social caste with little opportunity for social movement, the ruling of Riga's Senate opened new opportunities for future generations of inhabitants of Riga. Partly because of his support of the Moravian Church, it eventually became an accepted and popular religious movement among Latvians, having at one point 50,000 converts in three years.

Among his many descendants are: Rev. Johann Steinhauer III, Moravian Minister and Teacher, Principal of the Fulneck Moravian School in England, who established the Boarding School for young ladies at Gracehill in Ireland and who married the daughter of John Gambold, the first Moravian Bishop of the British Isles; Henry Steinhauer, the first Paleobotanist in the Americas and Principal of the Moravian Ladies Seminary of Bethlehem, Pennsylvania; Botanist and early Ohio plant collector Daniel Steinhauer; Barbara Steinhauer married to Sarepta's (now Volgograd, Russia) Doctor in Medicine Joachim Wier and Johanna Magdalena Riegelmann married to the jurist and administrator of the Hennersdorf Castle in Saxonia; Karl Eduard von Napiersky Dr. Philosophie, researcher, author and publisher of Latvian historical and biographical books: Index corporis historico-diplomatici Livoniae, Esthoniae, Curoniae, Monumenta Livoniae antiquae volumes 1 and 2, Beiträge zur Geschichte der Kirchen und Prediger in Livland. 4 Volumes, among others.
