= Wachovia Tract =

Area in North Carolina, United States

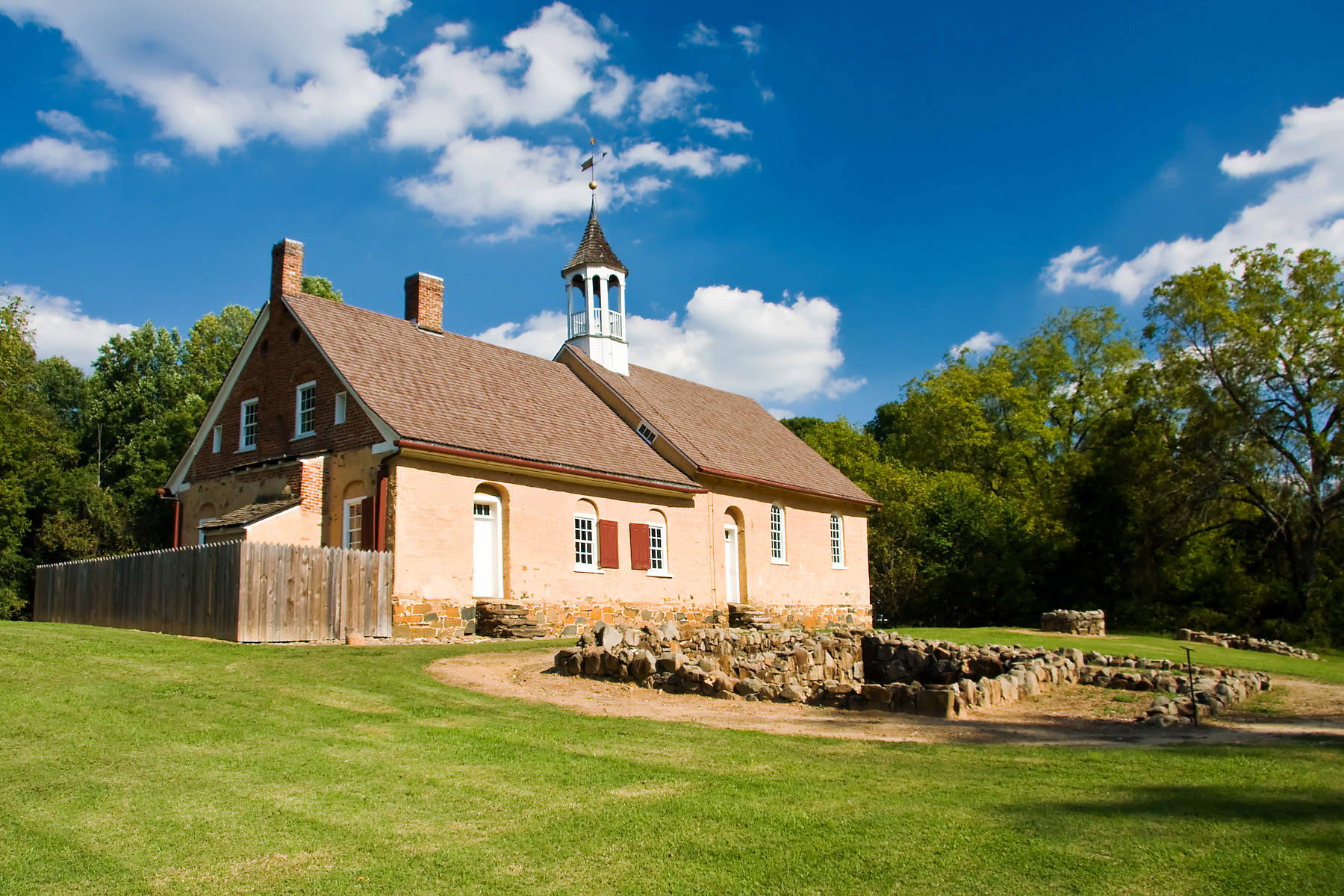
Bethabara Moravian Church, built 1788

Wachovia (/wɑːˈkoʊviə/) was the area settled by Moravians in what is now Forsyth County, North Carolina, United States. Of the six 18th-century Moravian "villages of the Lord" established in Wachovia, today only the town of Bethania and city of Winston-Salem exist within the historic Wachovia Tract. The historical tract was somewhat larger than present-day Winston-Salem and somewhat smaller than present-day Forsyth County.

== History ==
Wachovia's early settlers were mostly German-speaking people who shared a common Germanic cultural background.

In 1752 Moravian Bishop August Gottlieb "Brother Joseph" Spangenberg led an expedition to locate the area where the Unitas Fratrum, or Moravian church, intended to begin the Wachovia settlements. Members of the Moravian Church in Europe purchased 98,985 acres (400.58 km^{2}) of land in the backcountry (middle/western area) of the Province of North Carolina, from John Carteret, 2nd Earl Granville.

The land in North Carolina was purchased on behalf of the Moravians by John Henry (Johann Heinrich) Antes, who had also served as agent on behalf of the Moravians in the purchase of the 500-acre (2.0 km^{2}) tract which became the city of Bethlehem, Pennsylvania. He also served as Baumeister ("construction manager") of the first buildings which still stand in Bethlehem's historic district. 4,000 acres (16 km^{2}) were purchased by Johann Steinhauer, leader of the Moravian church in Riga (today's Latvia).

"Wachovia" is a Latinized form of the German name Wachau. It was chosen as the name of the North Carolina Moravian tract to honor Count Zinzendorf, Moravian patron and bishop whose family estate was located in the Wachau region northwest of Vienna, along the Danube River between the towns of Melk and Krems. Bishop Spangenberg and the surveying team in 1752 strayed into the mountains of western North Carolina, coming down through what is now Wilkes County (viz. "Moravian Falls" etc.) on their way to the Three Forks of Muddy Creek. It was this mountainous landscape in the Carolina back country along the Catawba, Little, New and Yadkin Rivers that suggested the Wachau region in Lower Austria.

Twelve Moravian Single Brethren traveling from Pennsylvania, most from the Christiansbrunn farm near Nazareth, arrived in Wachovia in 1753, forming Bethabara, in Hebrew meaning "House of Passage", a transitional congregational settlement founded November 17, 1753. In July 1756, during the French and Indian War (1754–1763), a wooden stockade was built around the central-most area of the Moravian settlement, and Bethabara became a place of refuge for settlers from across the region, with many refugees living near the Bethabara Mill, numbering 120 by May 1759.

The first planned Moravian settlement, and oldest incorporated municipality in Wachovia is Bethania, Province of North Carolina, formed June 12, 1759, also known historically as Bethany, meaning "house/place of dates and figs" in Hebrew. Bethania is the German form of Bethany. The Town of Bethania was incorporated in 1995, following the reactivation of Bethania's 1838/1839 town charter, and was spared from being annexed into the city of Winston-Salem. Today, Bethania remains the only independent, continuously active Moravian town in the southern United States. In 2007, Historic Bethania, a visitor center and museum, opened in Bethania, providing information and historical interpretation in yet another Wachovia Moravian community.

Wachovia's central administrative congregational town of Salem can be visited today at Old Salem Museums and Gardens. Salem was begun in 1766 (formally organized in 1771), and was built by Moravians and friends from Bethabara and Bethania.

Subsequent Moravian congregational settlements to be formed include Friedberg (1769), Friedland (1772), and Hope (1775). The congregation at Hope was the first "English" Moravian church in the area.

A secular county seat was founded in 1849 in newly drawn Forsyth County, north of Salem. The new county seat was named Winston in 1852. R. J. Reynolds Tobacco Company, maker of Winston, Salem, and Camel cigarettes, was founded at Winston in 1875. The towns of Salem and Winston merged as Winston-Salem in 1913. Bethabara now lies within the city limits of Winston-Salem, and can be visited today at Historic Bethabara Park, operated by the city of Winston-Salem and Forsyth County.

Over time, the 98,985-acre (400.58 km^{2}) Wachovia Tract was redrawn into the following counties as the backcountry of North Carolina became increasingly populated:

- 1753 Rowan County
- 1771 Surry County
- 1789 Stokes County
- 1849 Forsyth County was drawn out of what had been the southern half of Stokes County

== Museums ==
Historic Bethabara Park, Historic Bethania, and Old Salem Museums and Gardens are museums which serve to transport visitors in time to what Wachovia once was. The museums each contribute to the story of Moravians in North Carolina, and preserve, interpret, and demonstrate life in Wachovia over time.

== Wachovia Corporation ==
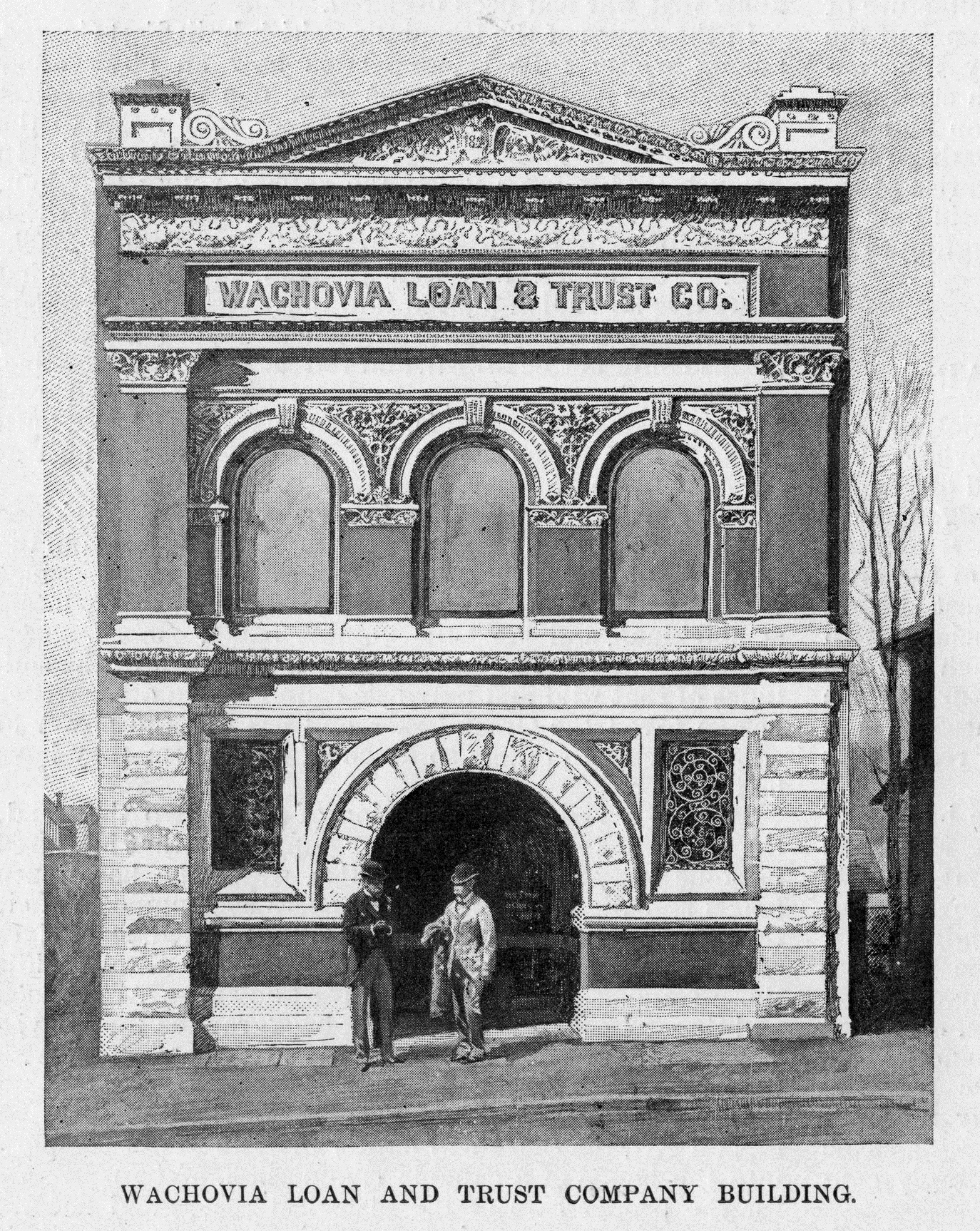
The first Wachovia Loan and Trust Company Building, located in Winston-Salem

The area is the namesake and birthplace of Wachovia Corporation, once one of the world's largest banks. The bank was pioneered by Bethanian I.G. Loesch. Salem, then Winston-Salem, was the corporate headquarters for the bank until its merger with the First Union corporation, when the headquarters was moved to Charlotte, North Carolina.

== See also ==
- Adelaide Fries, author of the 1907 The Mecklenburg Declaration of Independence As Mentioned in the Records of Wachovia.
