= Bethabara Historic District =

Historic district in North Carolina, US

- U.S. National Register of Historic Places
- U.S. National Historic Landmark District
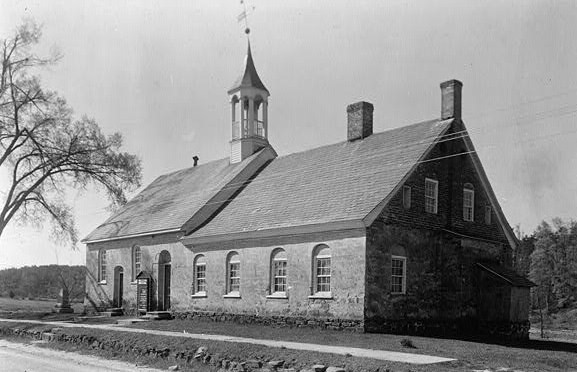
- Bethabara Moravian Church in 1934

- Location within North Carolina Location within the United States
- Location: North of Winston-Salem on NC 67, near Winston-Salem, North Carolina
- Coordinates: 36°9′16″N 80°17′55″W
- Area: 41 acres (17 ha)
- Built: 1753; 273 years ago
- NRHP reference No.: 78001948

Significant dates
- Added to NRHP: November 15, 1978
- Designated NHLD: January 20, 1999

Bethabara Historic District encompasses the surviving buildings and archaeological remains of a small Moravian community, that was first settled in 1753. Located in present-day Forsyth County, North Carolina, United States, it is now a public park of the city of Winston-Salem. It was designated a National Historic Landmark in 1999.

== History ==
Bethabara (from the Hebrew, meaning "House of Passage" and pronounced beth-ab-bra, the name of the traditional site of the Baptism of Jesus Christ) was a village located in what is now Forsyth County, North Carolina. It was the site where twelve men from the Moravian Church first settled in 1753 in an abandoned cabin in the 100,000-acre (400 km^{2}) tract of land the church had purchased from Lord Granville and dubbed Wachovia.

Its early settlers were noted for advanced agricultural practices, especially their medicine garden, which produced over fifty kinds of herbs.

Bethabara was never meant to be a permanent settlement. It was intended to house the Moravians until a more suitable location for a central village could be found. Just six months after arriving in Wachovia, the Seven Years' War (known as the French and Indian War in America) began in western Pennsylvania. The violence quickly spread to southwestern Virginia and western North Carolina. Bethabara hosted a large number of refugees until 1761. The establishment of a central town was delayed for thirteen years because of the growing Moravian population and hundreds of refugees.

Once it felt safe to do so in 1766, the central town Salem was begun. Many of the buildings in Bethabara were dismantled, and used for the new structures in Salem. As the houses were taken down, the small rootcellars were pushed in and filled.

With Salem completed in 1771, the official seat of government was transferred from Bethabara to Salem. Only a few residents remained behind. Bethabara became a farming community which supplied food to the other Moravians towns in Wachovia.

In 1788, an enslaved person, Johann Samuel, was made superintendent of the farm. He was freed in 1801, after 50 years of servitude to the Moravians. Bethabara continued to decline. The principal industries were farming and pottery, well into the 1850s.

== Historic Bethabara Park ==
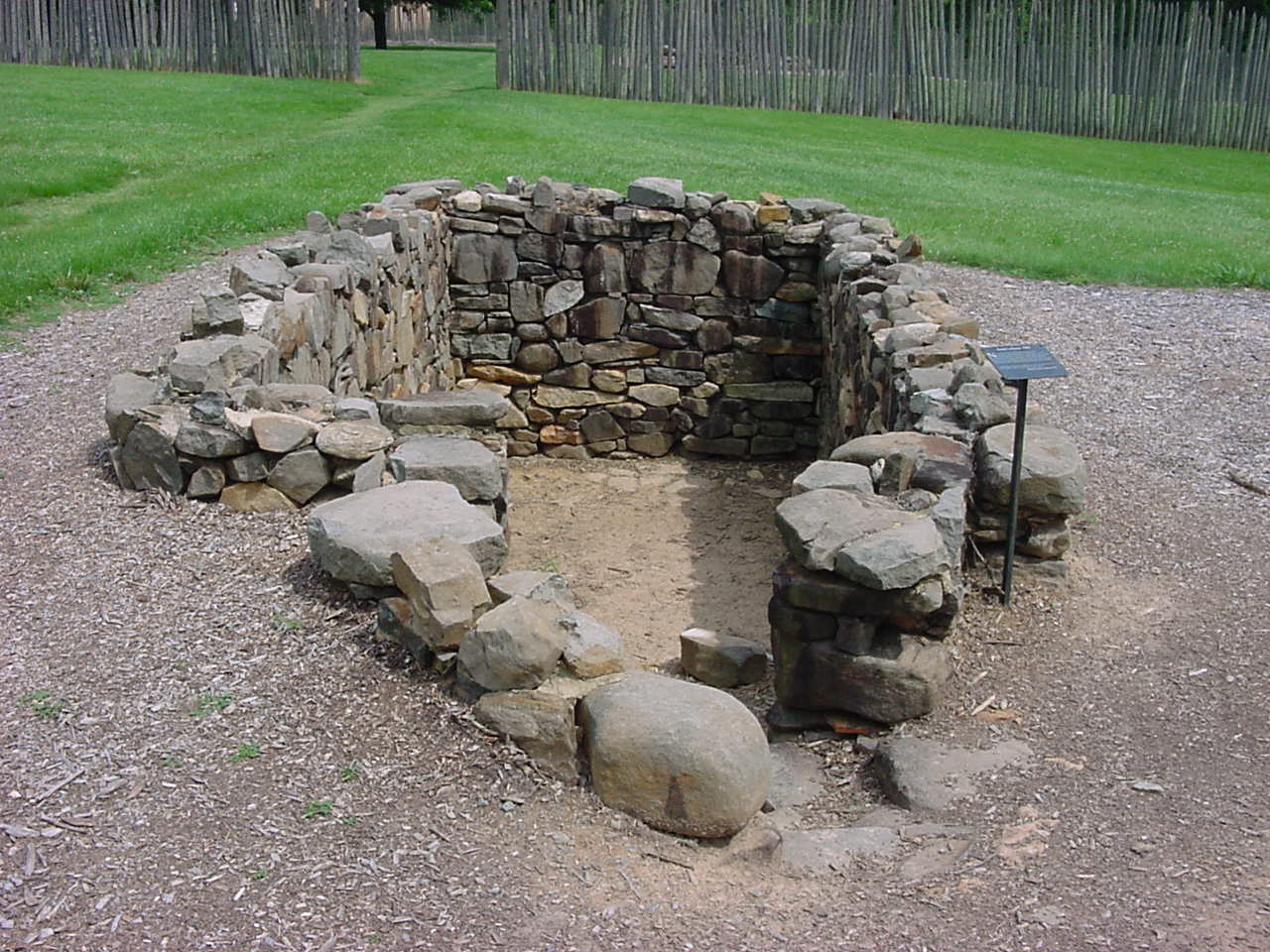
Excavated cellar of the 1762 Smith's House.

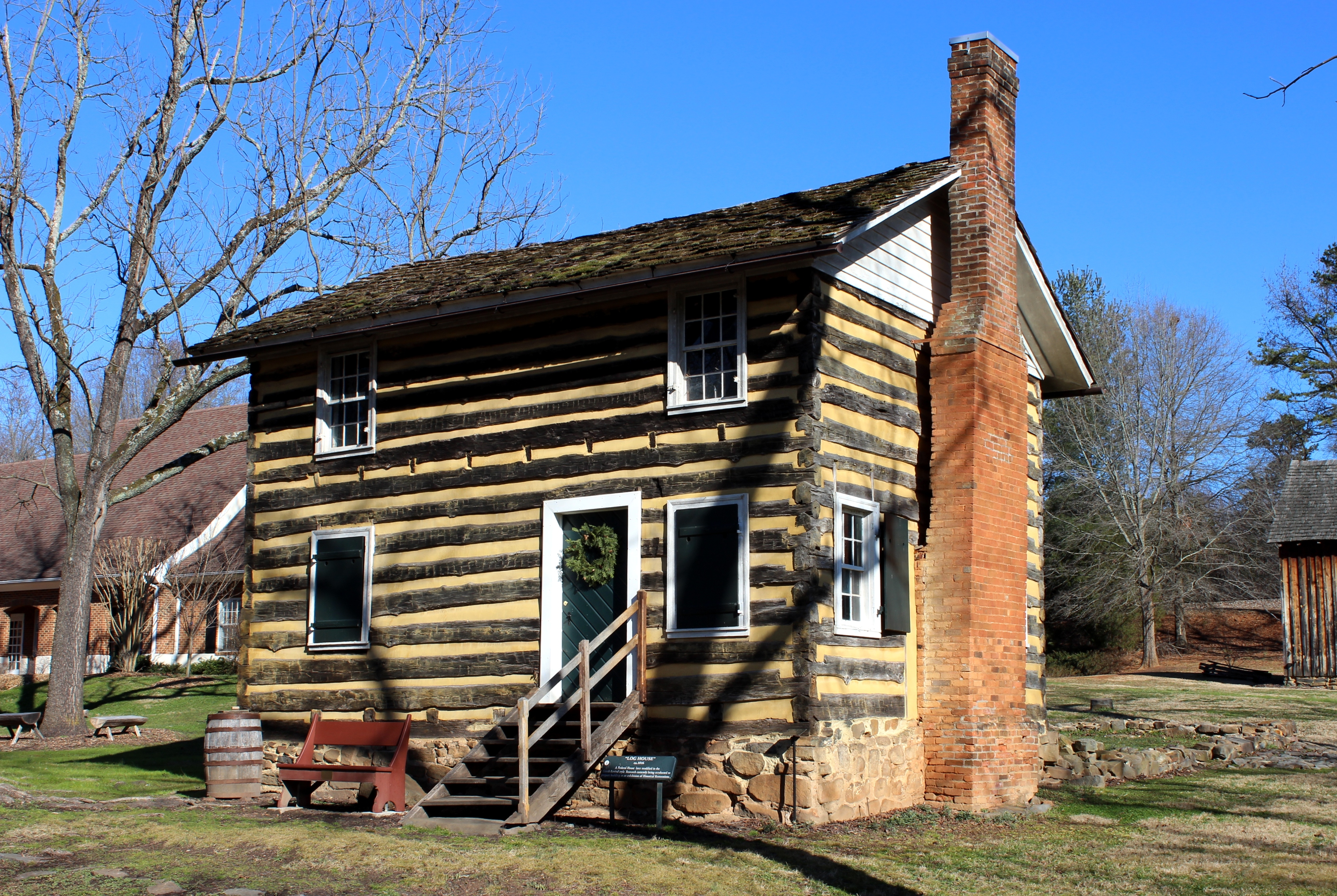
Log house, c. 1815–16 in Historic Bethabara.

Today, what remains of the village, including the excavated foundations of the original buildings, the restored Gemeinhaus (the Bethabara Moravian Church), and the reconstructed palisade and colonial gardens, is part of Historic Bethabara Park. The site was excavated by noted historical archaeologist Stanley South in the 1960s. The 183-acre (0.74 km^{2}) park and wildlife preserve is located in Winston-Salem and is operated by the City of Winston-Salem Recreation & Parks Department as an open-air museum. The site also features 20 miles (32 km) of nature trails.

There are frequent festivals and reenactments on the weekends, such as the Independence Weekend Celebration held the weekend prior to or during Independence Day.

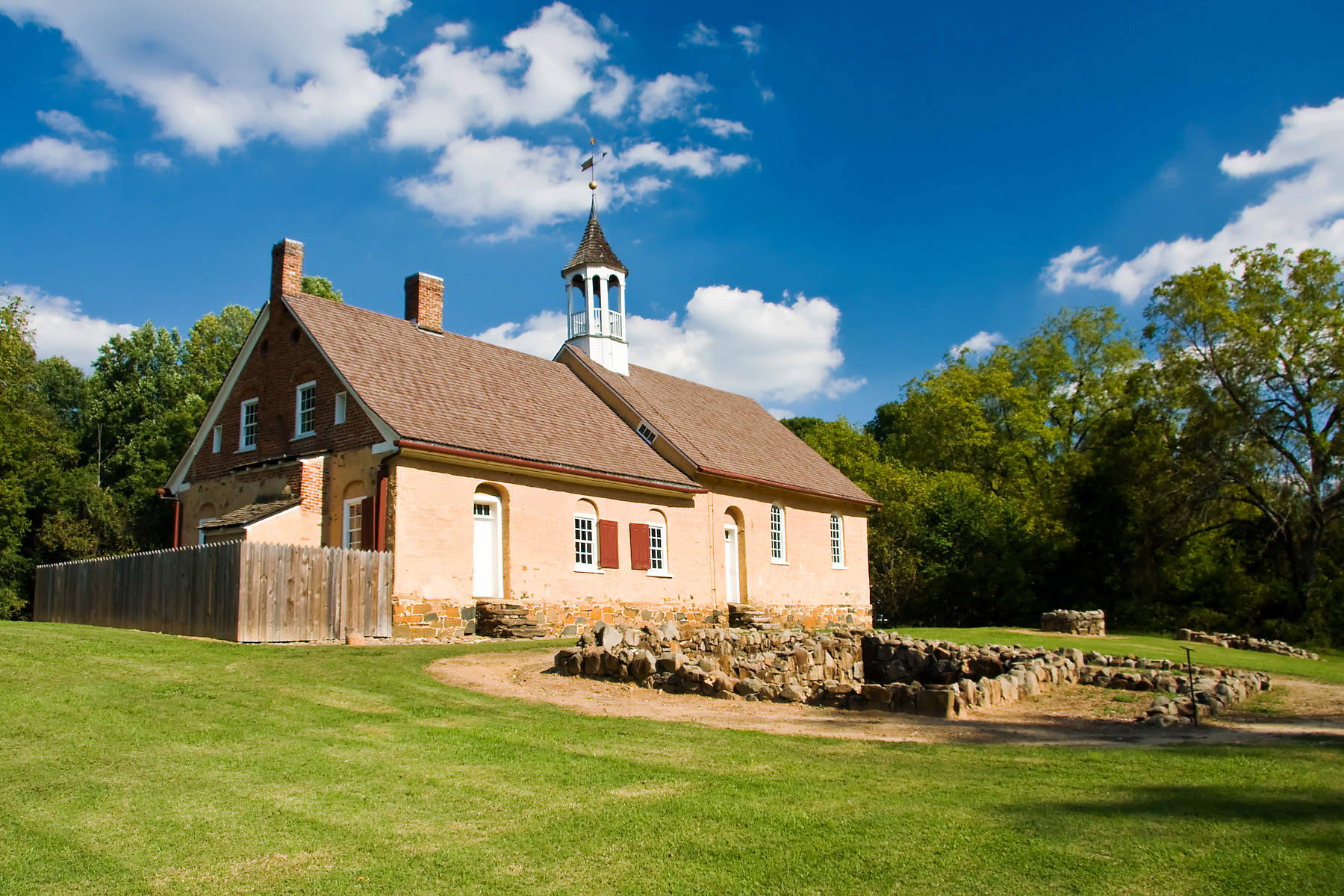
Bethabara Moravian Church also known as the Gemeinhaus

The Bethabara site was declared a National Historic Landmark in 1999. The Gemeinhaus was separately listed on the National Register of Historic Places in 1971.

== See also ==
- Bethania, North Carolina
- List of National Historic Landmarks in North Carolina
- National Register of Historic Places listings in Forsyth County, North Carolina
