= WBFJ =

WBFJ may refer to:

- WBFJ (AM), a radio station (1550 AM) licensed to serve Winston-Salem, North Carolina, United States
- WBFJ-FM, a radio station (89.3 FM) licensed to serve Winston-Salem

== See also ==
- West Bengal Film Journalists' Association (WBFJA), an Indian film journalists association
