= Winston-Salem Fire Department =

Operational area
- Country: United States
- State: North Carolina
- City: Winston-Salem

Agency overview
- Established: 1913
- Employees: 343 (2014)
- Annual budget: $25,494,480 (2014)
- Staffing: Career
- Fire chief: Trey Mayo
- IAFF: 682

Facilities and equipment
- Battalions: 4
- Stations: 20
- Engines: 19
- Trucks: 6
- Rescues: 1
- HAZMAT: 1
- Light and air: 1

Website
- Official website
- IAFF website

The Winston-Salem Fire Department (WSFD) provides fire protection to the city of Winston-Salem, North Carolina. In all the department is responsible for an area of 133 square miles (340 km^{2}). The history of the WSFD dates back to 1913 when the cities of Winston and Salem merged to form the city of Winston-Salem and gave birth to the Winston-Salem Fire Department.

== History ==
The earliest precursor to the Winston-Salem Fire Department was the Salem Fire Department, created after the construction of the Salem Church. In 1782, the fire inspection service was created to ensure that chimneys were properly being swept. If an infraction was found, the fire inspector could issue fines of up to $1 per day until the owner fixed the issue.

In 1951, the Winston-Salem Fire Department became the first integrated department in North Carolina. Eight total firefighters were hired to integrate the department. By 1967, the department was fully integrated.

== Incidents ==
On January 31, 2022, Weaver Fertilizer Plant caught fire in North Winston-Salem, prompting a major response from the department. Chief Mayo said that hundreds of personnel were involved in fighting the fire, and over 4 million gallons of water were used. The plant had large stores of ammonium nitrate, which made the fire especially dangerous to fight. “At the beginning of this incident, there was enough ammonium nitrate on hand for this to be one of the worst explosions in U.S. history,” Winston-Salem Fire Chief Trey Mayo said two days after the fire began. Records show that the amount of chemicals onsite were over 4.5 million pounds. Fear of explosion caused the fire department and Winston-Salem Police Department to evacuate over 6,000 individuals, and close several businesses. Because of the work of the fire department, the plant did not explode. In the aftermath of the disaster, the cause of the fire remains "undetermined" due to the extensive destruction of evidence.

== Stations and apparatus ==
As of May 2019 this is the current list of stations and apparatus:

fire station number	Address	Engine Company	Ladder Company	Special Units	Battalion Chief vehicle
1	651 N. Marshall St	Engine 1	Ladder 1	Brush 1	Battalion Chief 1
2	405 Somerset Dr	Engine 2	Ladder 2	Hazmat 1	
3	2995 N. Liberty St	Engine 3			Battalion Chief 3
4	290 Martin Luther King Jr. Dr	Engine 4			Battalion Chief 2
5	771 Palmer Ln	Engine 5	Ladder 5		
6	1717 W. Academy St	Engine 6			Battalion Chief 4
7	100 Arbor Rd			Rescue 1 Water Rescue 1	
8	2457 Reynolda Rd	Engine 8		Rescue 3	
9	4685 Ogburn Ave	Engine 9			
10	4700 Country Club Rd	Engine 10		Rescue 2	
11	2745 Waughtown St	Engine 11			
12	3620 New Walkertown Rd	Engine 12			
13	2110 Bethel Methodist Church Ln	Engine 13		Air 1 Safety 7	
14	5754 Shattalon Dr	Engine 14	Ladder 14		
15	4548 Shattalon Dr	Engine 15			
16	1701 Pope Rd	Engine 16			
17	4295 Old Greensboro Rd	Engine 17			
18	1505 N. Peacehaven Rd	Engine 18	Ladder 18		
19	4430 Glenn Hi Rd		Ladder 19		
20	5991 Koger Ln	Engine 20			
