= Forsyth Technical Community College =

Public college in Winston-Salem, North Carolina, US

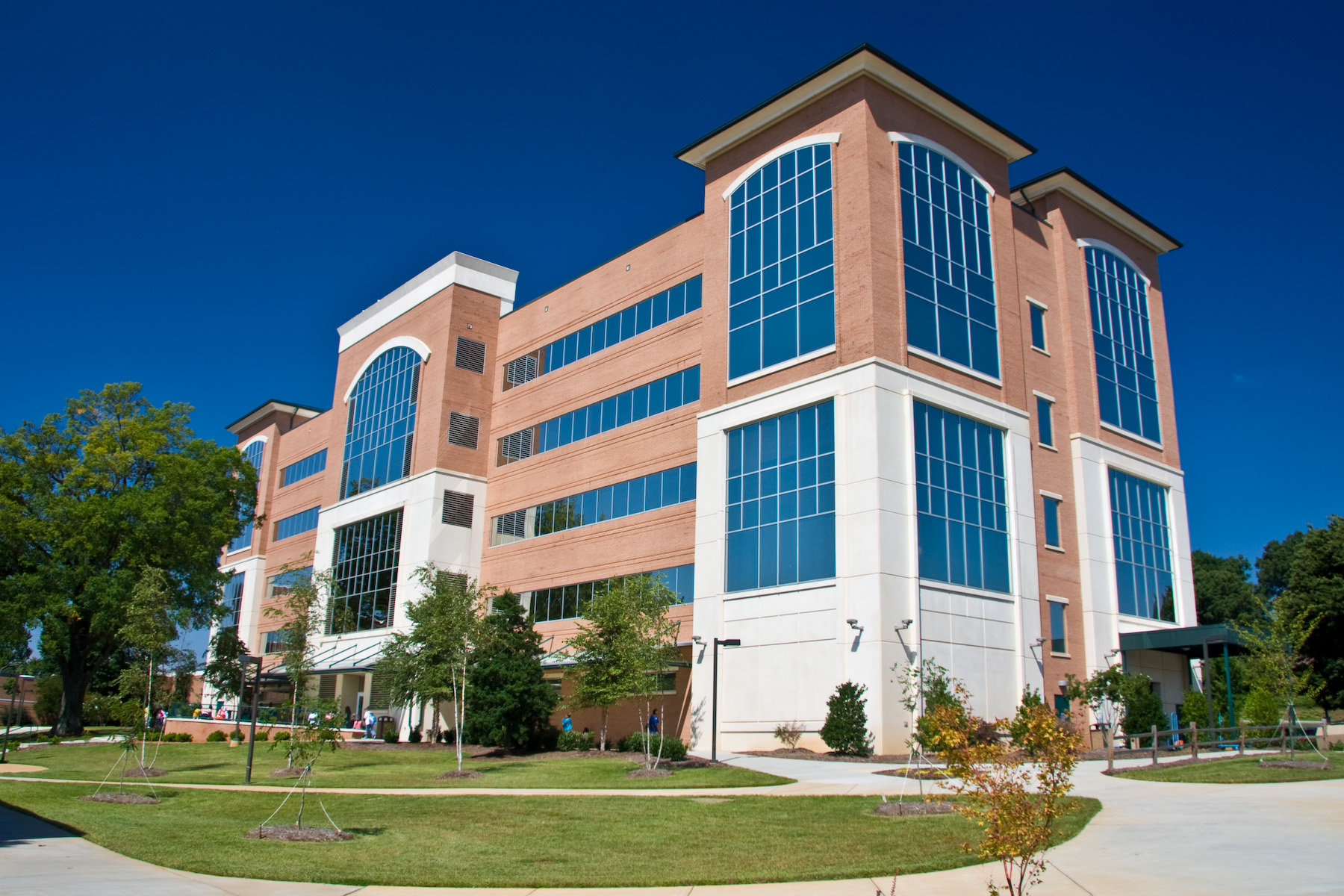
- Technology Building, main campus
- Former names: Winston-Salem/Forsyth County Industrial Education Center (1960-1964); Forsyth Technical Institute (1964-1985); Forsyth Technical College (1985-1987)
- Type: Public community college
- Established: 1960
- Parent institution: North Carolina Community College System
- Budget: $98,901,322
- President: Janet N. Spriggs
- Academic staff: 536 full-time, 630 part-time
- Undergraduates: 7000 credit students
- Other students: 24,342 economic & workforce development students
- Location: Winston-Salem, North Carolina, U.S. 36.0687°N 80.2717°W
- Campus: Multiple campuses
- Colors: Blue and teal
- Nickname: Trailblazers
- Mascot: Blaze the Gray Fox
- Website: forsythtech.edu
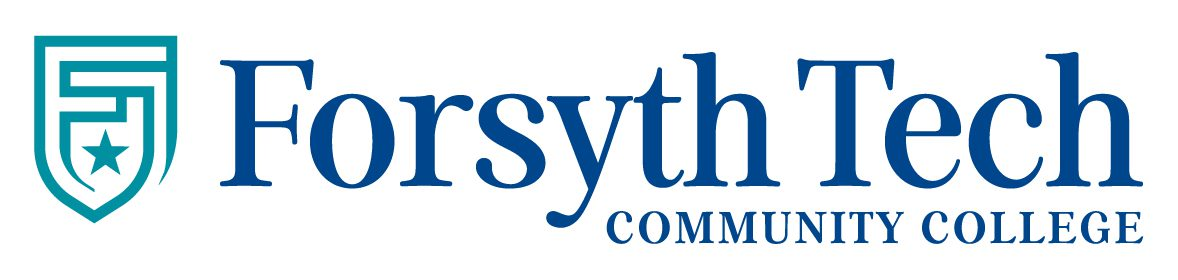

Forsyth Technical Community College, (Forsyth Tech) is a public community college in Winston-Salem, North Carolina. The college is one of the largest in the North Carolina Community College System, with an enrollment of over 11,000 credit students and over 24,000 Corporate and Continuing Education students.

The college has twelve locations in Forsyth and Stokes counties and offers many distance learning classes and specialty programs in addition to 67 Associates in Applied Science degrees, 20 college transfer (Associates in Arts and Associates in Science) degrees, 35 diplomas, and 67 certificates.

Under the leadership of Dr. Bob H. Greene (May 25, 1936 – July 14, 2011), the community college grew at an unprecedented rate, adding two new facilities and gaining further prestige in the Winston-Salem community.

Forsyth Tech was briefly mentioned in President Barack Obama's 2011 State of the Union Address as an example of education reform in low-income and low-opportunity areas. President Obama visited the school to give a speech on October 6, 2010.

Early College Of Forsyth and Middle College Of Forsyth are high school programs on the Forsyth Tech campus in which students take community college classes, and earn an associate degree by graduation of high school. The high school's calendar is the same as Forsyth Tech.
