= New Winston Museum =

Coordinates: 36.09285°N 80.24458°W

MUSE Winston-Salem
- MUSE Winston-Salem
- Former name: New Winston Museum
- Location: Winston-Salem, North Carolina, United States
- Type: Local history museum
- Founder: Frank Borden Hanes, Sr.
- Executive director: Dr. Mike Wakeford
- Website: musews.org

MUSE Winston-Salem is a local-history museum in the city of Winston-Salem in the U.S. state of North Carolina. The museum's focus is on Winston-Salem and Forsyth County history from 1850 to the present.

Previously named the New Winston Museum, the museum opened in 2012 at 713 S. Marshall St, near the Old Salem museum complex. Under founder and benefactor Frank Borden Hanes, Sr., the goal of the museum was to share local history of the Winston-Salem and Forsyth County area. The museum’s name, MUSE, is an acronym for the Museum of Understanding, Storytelling, and Engagement, a name that succinctly encompasses the museum’s vision and commitment to diversity and community history.

In 2017, the New Winston Museum moved into temporary offices, located at 418 N. Marshall St, while in search of a larger space.

The museum rebranded as MUSE Winston-Salem (or MUSEws) and moved into their new facility at 226 S. Liberty St in January 2020. The outbreak of the COVID-19 pandemic slowed renovations on the building, and the grand reopening of the museum was delayed.

Formerly the site of the Federal Bankruptcy Court, the museum’s building and surrounding area hold much of the community history that Hanes hoped to share with the public. The core exhibit space of MUSEws is the old courtroom, which will host a permanent display that includes a fire engine from the city’s early days and barstools from S. H. Kress lunch counter, where North Carolina’s very first successful lunch counter desegregation protest took place.

The Mosaic Room event space hosts a floor-to-ceiling stained glass window, recovered from the Smith Reynolds Airport. The stained glass window was installed at Smith Reynolds in 1962, during its heyday as a commercial airport. Depicted at the center of the window is the Forsyth County seal, which was designed in 1949 by local high school student Willie H. Johnson, Jr., for the 100th anniversary of the county. The Mosaic Room is also available as a rental venue for private events.

Currently, MUSEws is hosting a holiday pop-up exhibit called Camel Train, which celebrates the private collections of Carolyn Walker and Rence Callahan. Camel Train will be open to the public from November 19, 2026, to January 3, 2027.

MUSEws will officially open to the public in the spring of 2027.
