= Winston-Salem, North Carolina =

City in North Carolina, United States

Winston-Salem
- City
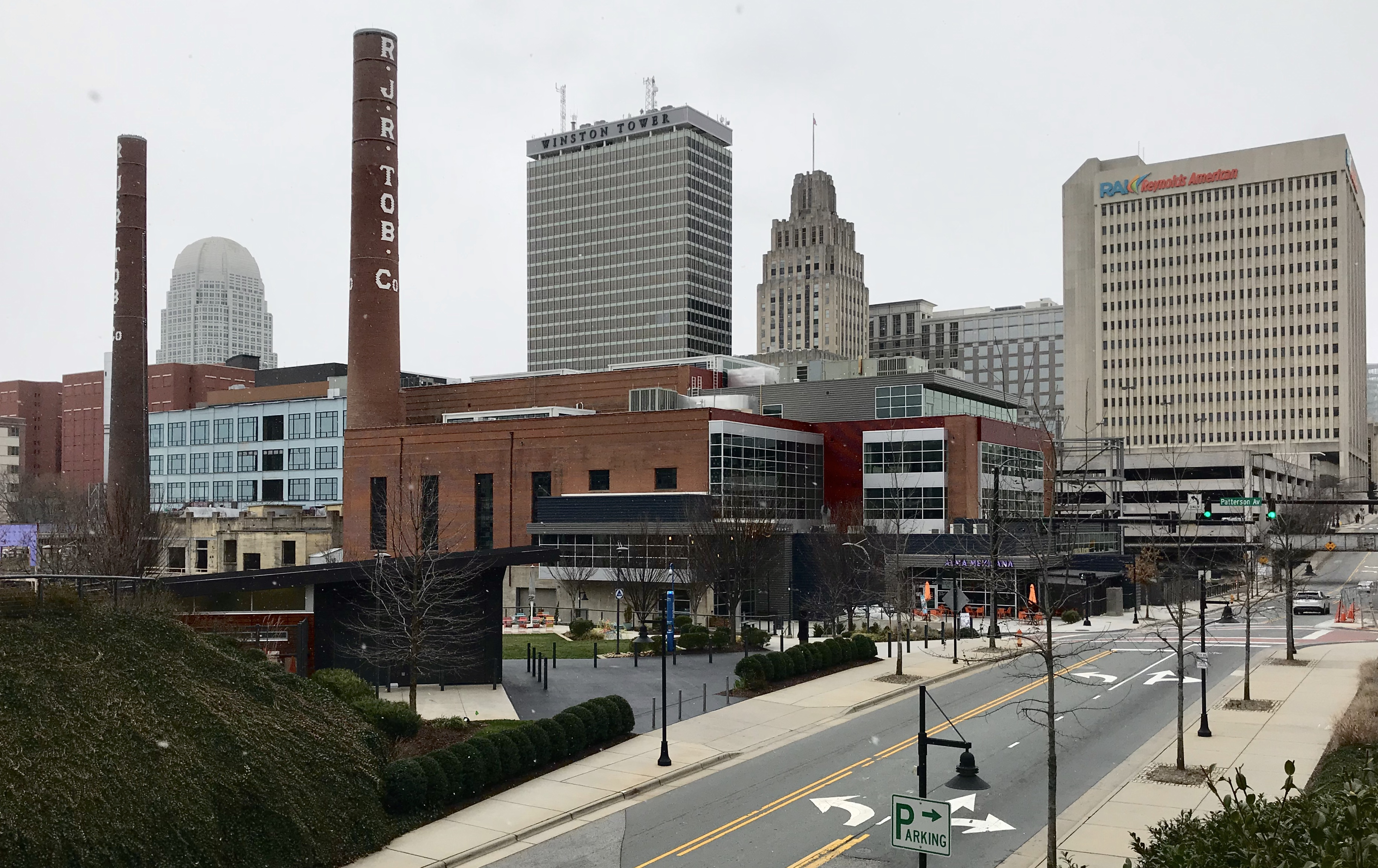
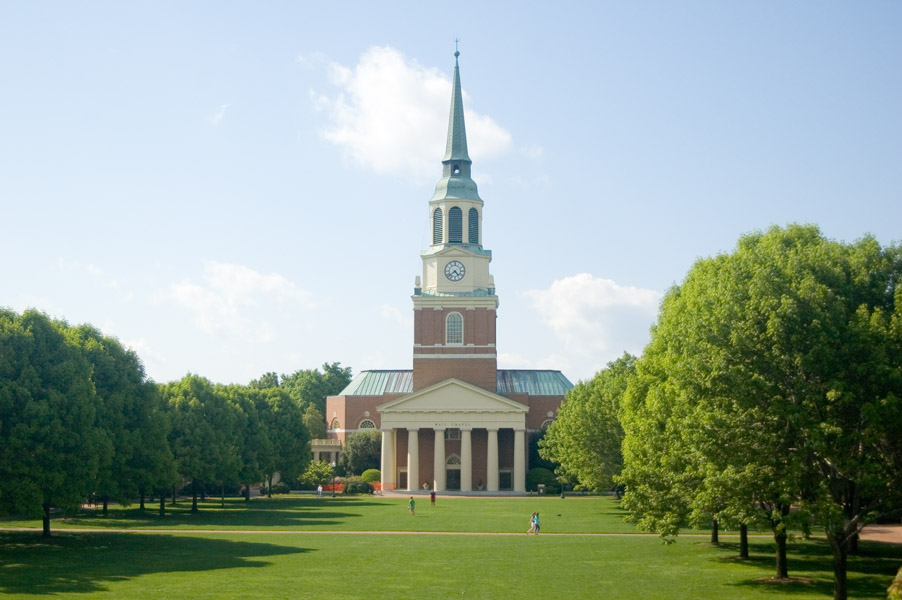
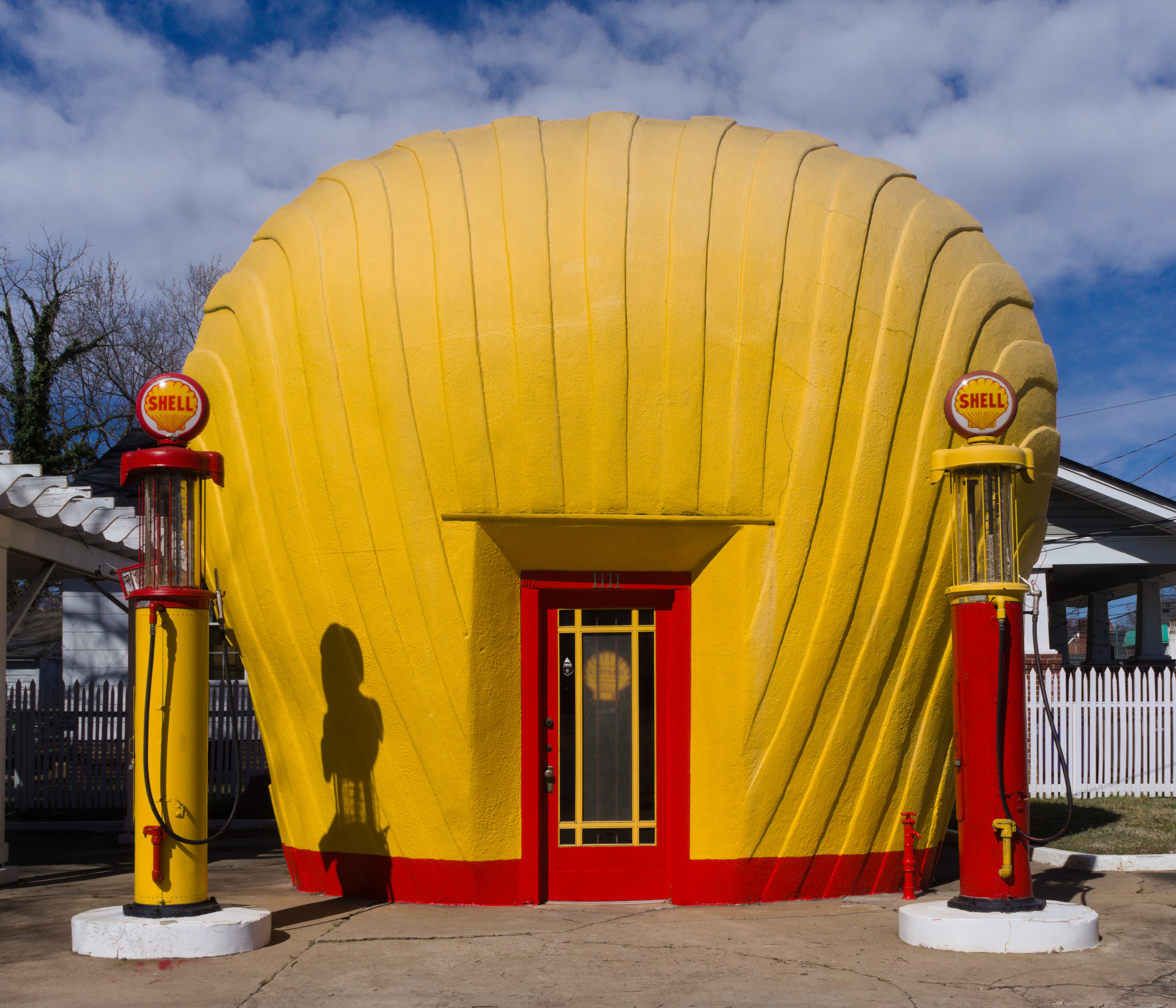
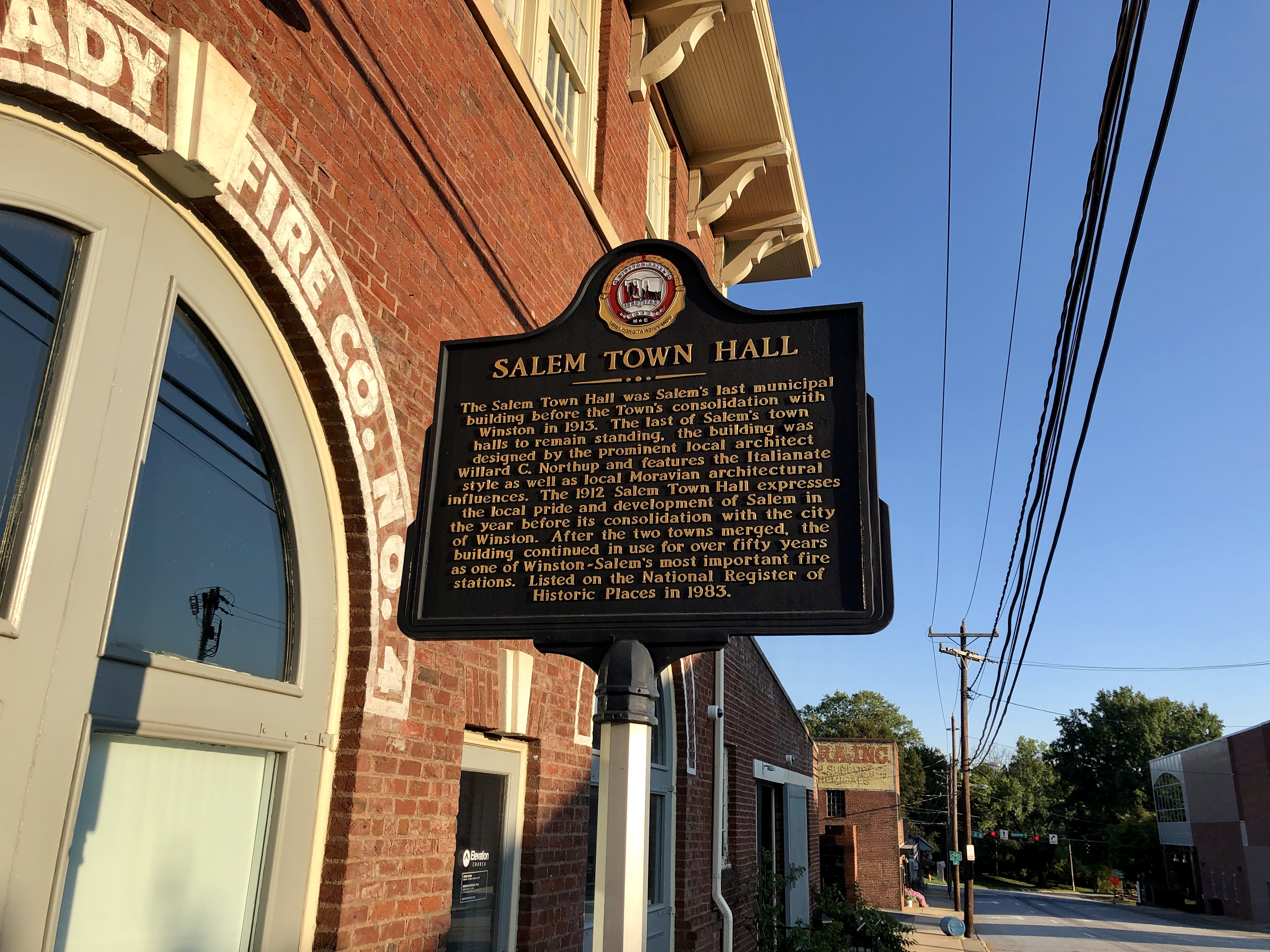
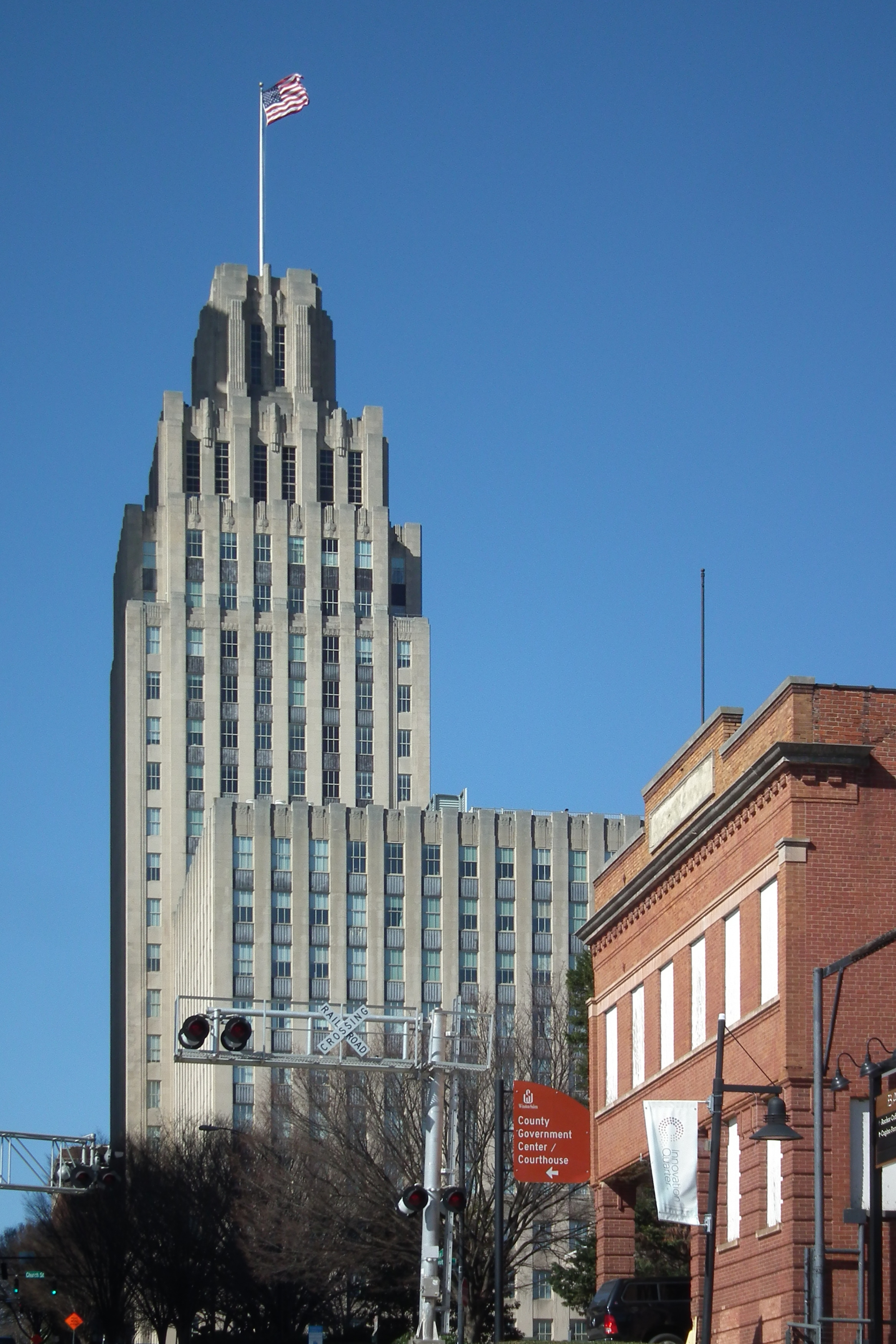
- Downtown Winston-Salem skyline in 2020 Wake Forest University Shell Service Station Old Salem Reynolds Building

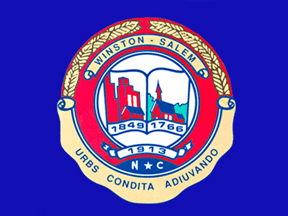
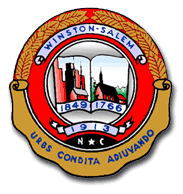
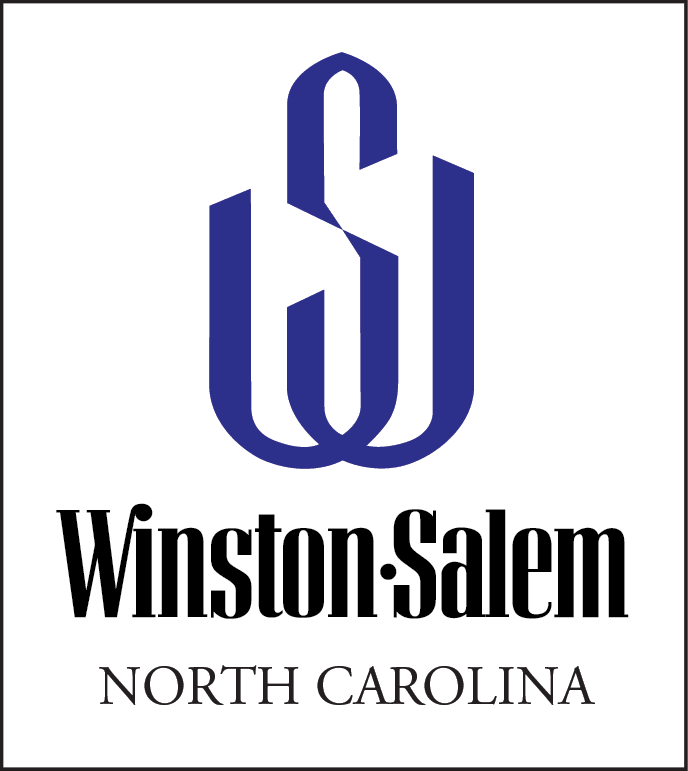
- Flag Seal Logo
- Nicknames: Twin City, Camel City
- Motto: Urbs Condita Adiuvando (Latin) ("A city founded on cooperation")
- Interactive map of Winston-Salem
- Location within North Carolina Location within the United States
- Coordinates: 36°06′10″N 80°15′39″W
- Country: United States
- State: North Carolina
- County: Forsyth
- Founded: 1766 (Salem), 1849 (Winston)
- Consolidated: 1913 (Winston-Salem)
- Named for: Joseph Winston and "Shalom" (Hebrew meaning "Peace")

Government
  - Mayor: Allen Joines (D)
  - City Manager: William "Pat" Pate

Area
  - Total: 133.87 sq mi (346.71 km^{2})
  - Land: 132.68 sq mi (343.63 km^{2})
  - Water: 1.19 sq mi (3.08 km^{2}) 0.89%
- Elevation: 791 ft (241 m)

Population (2020)
  - Total: 249,545
  - Estimate (2025): 257,271 ▲
  - Rank: 5th in North Carolina; 90th in United States
  - Density: 1,881/sq mi (726.2/km^{2})
  - Urban: 420,924 (US: 98th)
  - Urban density: 1,354/sq mi (522.9/km^{2})
  - Metro: 712,206 (2,025; US: 85th)
- Demonym: Winston-Salemite

GDP
  - Metro: $40.939 billion (2022)
- Time zone: UTC−5 (Eastern)
  - Summer (DST): UTC−4 (EDT)
- ZIP codes: 27023, 27040, 27045, 27101-27110, 27113-27117, 27120, 27127, 27130, 27150, 27152, 27155, 27157, 27198-27199, 27284
- Area codes: 336, 743
- FIPS code: 37-75000
- GNIS ID: 2405771
- Website: www.cityofws.org

Winston-Salem is a city in and the county seat of Forsyth County, North Carolina, United States. It is in the northwestern Piedmont Triad region and has 249,545 residents as of the 2020 census and an estimated population of 257,271 in 2025, making it the fifth-most-populous city in North Carolina and the 90th-most-populous city in the United States. It anchors the Winston-Salem metropolitan statistical area, which is located in the west of the Piedmont Triad region and had an estimated population of 712,206 in 2025.

Winston-Salem was created in 1913 through the consolidation of Salem, a Moravian settlement established in 1766, and Winston, established in 1849 as the seat of the newly formed Forsyth County. The city developed as a major center of tobacco and textile manufacturing and banking, associated with companies including the R. J. Reynolds Tobacco Company, Hanes, and Wachovia. Its economy later diversified, with health care, education, research, manufacturing, and other services becoming major sectors.

The city is home to higher-education institutions such as Wake Forest University, Winston-Salem State University, the University of North Carolina School of the Arts, Salem College, and Forsyth Technical Community College. Its historic sites, museums, and cultural events include Old Salem, the Reynolda House Museum of American Art, NCMA Winston-Salem, and the National Black Theatre Festival.

== History ==
Various tribes, such as the Cheraw and the Keyauwee, inhabited the area. Followers of the Moravian Church had interacted with Cherokees. The city of Winston-Salem is a product of the merging of the two neighboring towns of Winston and Salem in 1913.

=== History of Salem ===
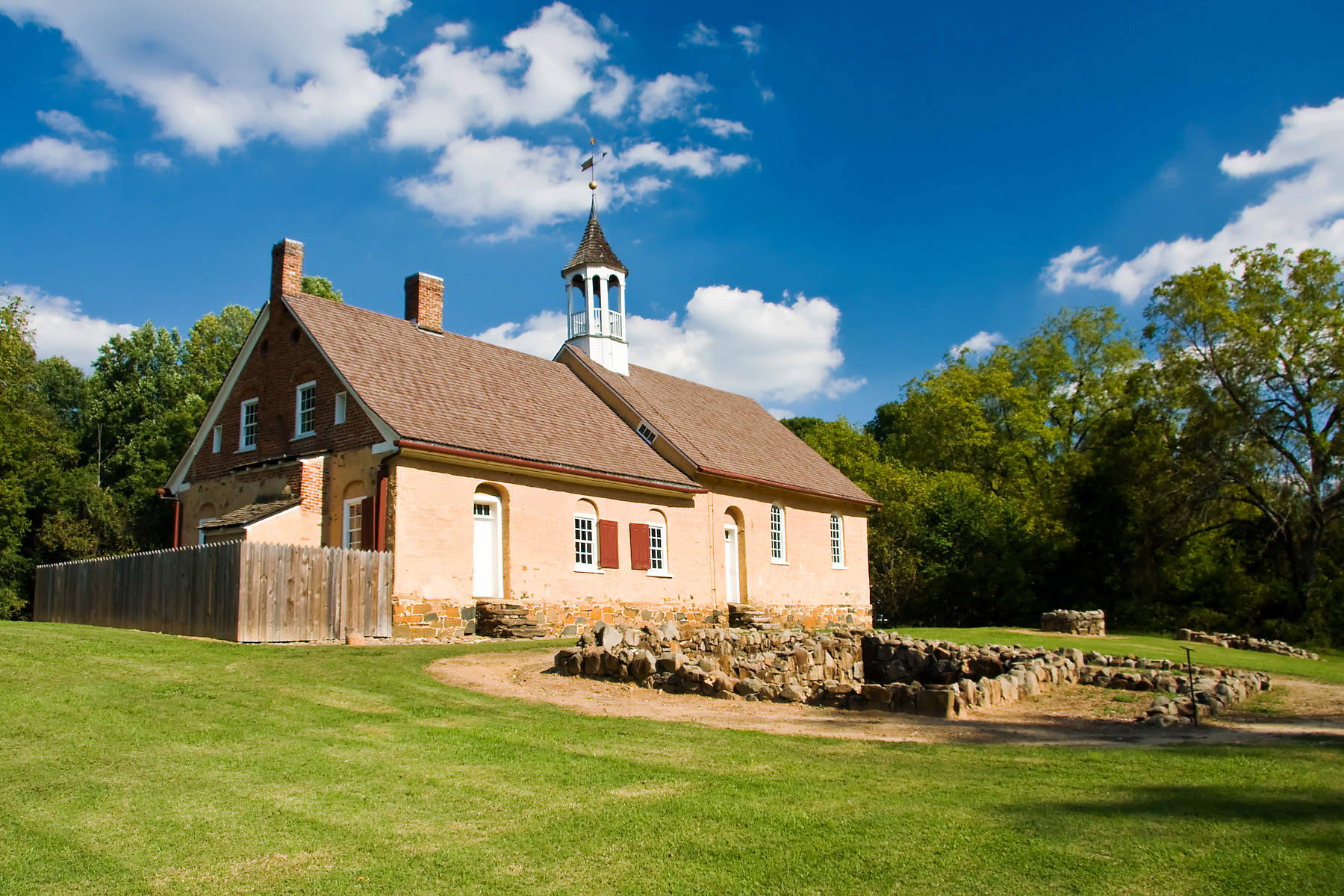
Bethabara Moravian Church, built in 1788, is part of the Bethabara Historic District.

The origin of the town of Salem dates to 1753, when Bishop August Gottlieb Spangenberg, on behalf of the Moravian Church, selected a settlement site in the three forks of Muddy Creek. He called this area "die Wachau" (Latin form Wachovia) after the ancestral estate of Count Nicolaus Ludwig von Zinzendorf. The land, just short of 99,000 acres (400 km^{2}), was subsequently purchased from John Carteret, 2nd Earl Granville.

On November 17, 1753, the first settlers arrived at what would later become the town of Bethabara. This town, despite its rapid growth, was not designed to be the primary settlement on the tract. Some residents expanded to a nearby settlement, called Bethania, in 1759. Finally, lots were drawn to select among suitable sites for the location of a new town.

The town established on the chosen site was given the name of Salem (from "Shalom", Hebrew meaning "Peace", after the Canaanite city mentioned in the Book of Genesis) chosen for it by the Moravians' patron, Count Zinzendorf. On January 6, 1766, the first tree was felled for the building of Salem. Salem was a typical Moravian settlement congregation, with the public buildings of the congregation grouped around a central square (today Salem Square). These included the church, a Brethren's House, and a Sisters' House for the unmarried members of the congregation, which owned all the property in town. For many years, only members of the Moravian Church were permitted to live in the settlement. This practice had ended by the American Civil War. Many of the original buildings in the settlement have been restored or rebuilt and are now part of Old Salem Museums & Gardens.

Salem was incorporated as a town in December 1856. Salem Square and God's Acre Cemetery, the Moravian graveyard, have been the site of the Moravian sunrise service each Easter morning since 1772. This service, sponsored by all the Moravian church parishes in the city, attracts thousands of worshipers each year, some from overseas.

=== History of Winston ===
In 1849, the Salem Congregation sold land north of Salem to the newly formed Forsyth County for a county seat. The new town was called "the county town" or Salem until 1851, when it was renamed Winston for a local hero of the Revolutionary War, Joseph Winston. For its first two decades, Winston was a sleepy community. In 1868, work began by Salem and Winston business leaders to connect the town to the North Carolina Railroad. By the 1880s, there were many different tobacco factories in the town, with notable ones owned by Pleasant Hanes and R.J. Reynolds. Pleasant Hanes founded Hanes (formerly called Shamrock Knitting Mills) in 1900.

=== Merger of Winston-Salem ===
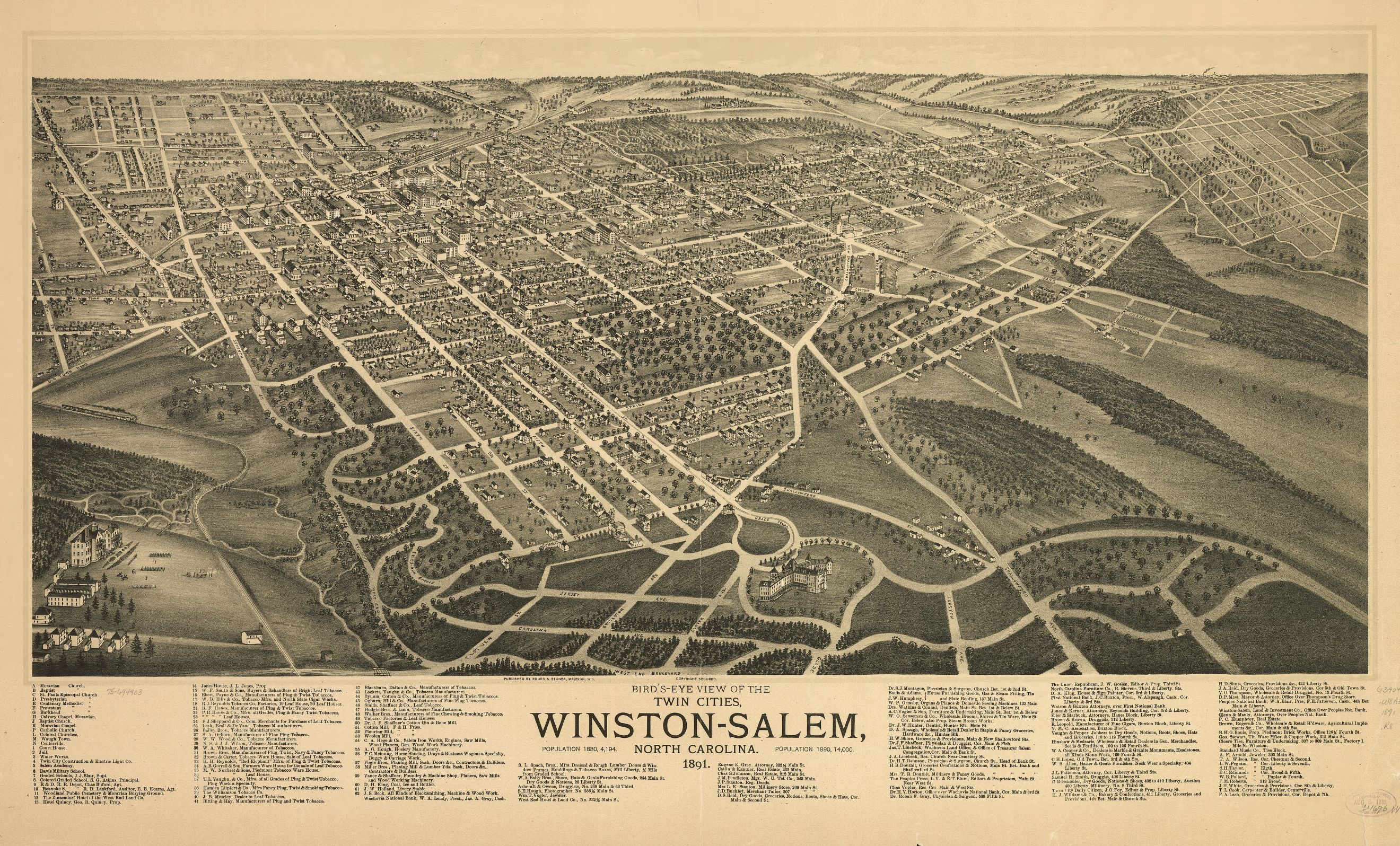
Winston-Salem, 1891

Robert Gray, as a featured speaker at the 1876 centennial celebration, was the first to mention the two towns as one. In the 1880s, the US Post Office began referring to the two towns together as Winston-Salem. In 1899, after nearly a decade of contention, the United States Post Office Department established the Winston-Salem post office in Winston, with the former Salem office serving as a branch. After a referendum the towns were officially incorporated as "Winston-Salem" in 1913.

The Reynolds family, namesake of the R. J. Reynolds Tobacco Company, played a large role in the history and public life of Winston-Salem. By the 1940s, 60% of Winston-Salem workers worked either for Reynolds or in the J. Wesley Hanes textile factories. The Reynolds company imported so much French cigarette paper and Turkish tobacco for Camel cigarettes that Winston-Salem was designated by the United States federal government as an official port of entry for the United States, despite the city being 200 miles (320 km) inland. Winston-Salem was the eighth-largest port of entry in the United States by 1916. In 1917, the Reynolds company bought 84 acres (340,000 m^{2}) of property in Winston-Salem and built 180 houses that it sold at cost to workers, to form a development called "Reynoldstown". By the time R.J. Reynolds died in 1918, his company owned 121 buildings in Winston-Salem.

In 1920, with a population of 48,395, Winston-Salem was the largest city in North Carolina.

In 1929, the Reynolds Building was completed in Winston-Salem. Designed by William F. Lamb from the architectural firm Shreve, Lamb and Harmon, the Reynolds Building is a 314-foot (96 m) skyscraper that has 21 floors. When completed as the headquarters of R.J. Reynolds Tobacco Company, it was the tallest building in the United States south of Baltimore, Maryland, and it was named the best building of the year by the American Institute of Architects. The building is well known for being the predecessor and prototype for the much larger Empire State Building, which was built in 1931 in New York City.

In 1892, Simon Green Atkins founded Slater Industrial Academy, which later became Winston-Salem State University, a public HBCU. In 1956, Wake Forest College, now known as Wake Forest University, moved to Winston-Salem from its original location in Wake Forest, North Carolina.

Winston-Salem was officially dubbed the "City of Arts and Innovation" in 2014.

On January 31, 2022, a major fire broke out at the Winston Weaver fertilizer plant in North Winston-Salem. The facility contained over 600 tons of ammonium nitrate, a highly explosive chemical with a noted history in industrial accidents, leading fire officials to warn that it posed a severe risk of detonating and according to fire chief William "Trey" Mayo, "one of the worst explosions in U.S. history". Emergency officials urged an evacuation of approximately 6,500 residents from 2,500 homes within a one-mile radius. Ultimately, the ammonium nitrate did not explode, and firefighters successfully mitigated the hazard before reducing the evacuation zone on February 3, allowing residents to return to their homes. In the aftermath of the disaster, the cause of the fire remains "undetermined" due to the extensive destruction of evidence, and the company subsequently settled multiple class-action lawsuits brought by displaced residents and local businesses.

=== Notable early businesses ===
- In 1799, the C. Winkler Bakery, noted for its Moravian cookies, was commissioned, and in 1807, the congregation brought in Christian Winkler of Pennsylvania to operate the bakery; his family owned and operated the business until 1929. It continues to operate today as part of Old Salem.
- In 1875, R. J. Reynolds founded R. J. Reynolds Tobacco Company, later famous for branded products such as Prince Albert pipe tobacco (1907) and Camel cigarettes (1913). Other brands that it made famous are Winston, Salem, Doral, and Eclipse cigarettes. The Winston-Salem area is still the primary international manufacturing center for Reynolds brands of cigarettes, although employment is down from its peak of nearly 30,000 to under 3,000.
- In 1901, Hanes's Shamrock Hosiery Mills in Winston-Salem began making men's socks. Shortly afterward, his brother Pleasant Henderson Hanes founded the P.H. Hanes Knitting Company, which manufactured men's underwear. The two firms eventually merged to become the Hanes Corporation, now known as Hanesbrands, manufacturing textiles.
- In 1906, the Bennett Bottling Company produced Bennett's Cola, a "Fine Carbonic Drink". The name was changed to Winston-Salem Bottling Works in 1915.
- In 1911, Wachovia Bank and Trust was formed by the merger of Wachovia National Bank (founded in 1879 by James Alexander Gray and William Lemly) and Wachovia Loan and Trust (founded 1893). The company was purchased by First Union in 2001, which changed its name to Wachovia. Wachovia was purchased by Wells Fargo in 2009, and the Wachovia name was retired in 2011.
- In 1928, Miller's Clothing Store was opened by Mrs. Henry Miller. Miller's Variety Store operated at the same location at 622 North Trade Street until closing at the end of 2016. Miller's was the first store in Winston-Salem to offer bell-bottoms in the area in the 1960s. Miller's was listed by Playboy magazine in 1968 as a popular place to shop.
- In 1929, the local T.W. Garner Foods introduced Texas Pete, a popular hot sauce.
- In 1929, Quality Oil Company was organized in December 1929, initially to launch a distributorship for the then-little-known Shell Oil Company.
- In 1934, Malcolm Purcell McLean formed McLean Trucking Co. The firm benefited from the tobacco and textile industry headquartered in Winston-Salem, and became the second-largest trucking firm in the nation.
- In 1937, Krispy Kreme opened its first doughnut shop on South Main Street.
- In 1948, Piedmont Airlines was formed out of the old Camel City Flying Service. The airline was based at Smith Reynolds Airport in Winston-Salem but marked its first commercial flight out of Wilmington, North Carolina, on February 20, 1948. Piedmont grew to become one of the top airlines in the country before its purchase by USAir (later US Airways, merged with American Airlines in 2015) in 1987. American Airlines maintains a reservation center in the old Piedmont reservations office.

== Geography ==
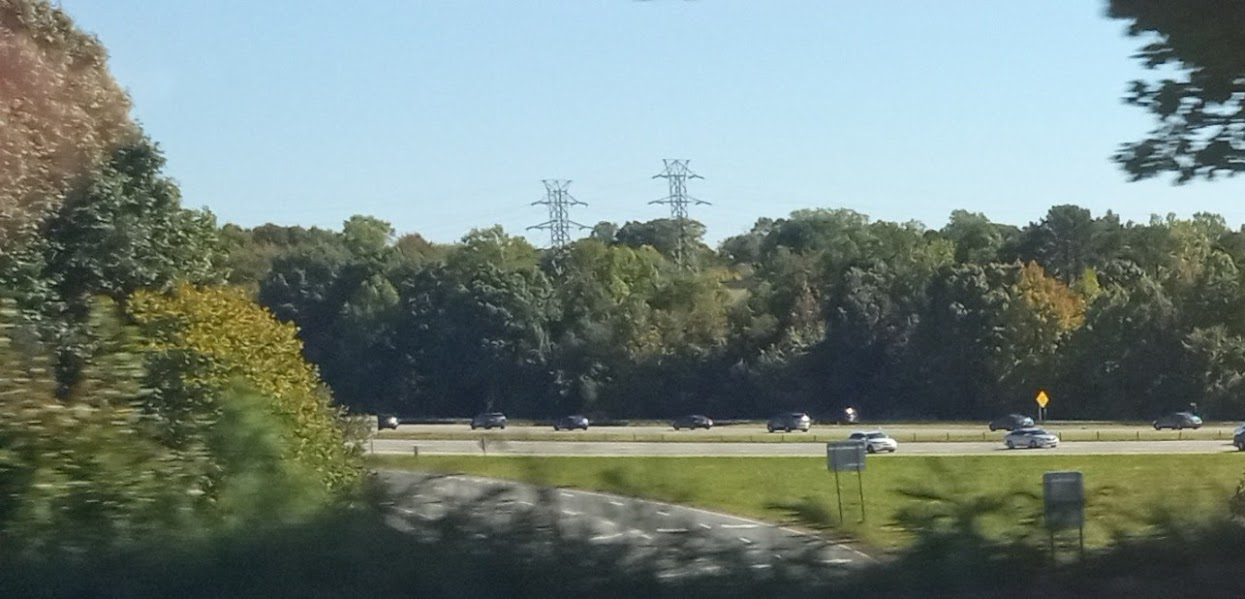
Interstate 40 in Winston-Salem

Winston-Salem is in the northwest Piedmont area of North Carolina, situated 65 miles (105 km) northwest of the geographic center of the state. According to the United States Census Bureau's 2020 gazetteer, the city has a total area of 133.87 square miles (346.7 km^{2}), of which 132.68 square miles (343.6 km^{2}) is land and 1.19 square miles (3.1 km^{2}) (0.89%) is water. The city lies within the Yadkin–Pee Dee River Basin, draining mainly via Salem Creek, Peters Creek, Silas Creek, and Muddy Creek.

Less than 30 miles (50 km) north of Winston-Salem are the remains of the ancient Sauratown Mountains, named for the Saura people who once lived in much of the Piedmont area, including what is now Winston-Salem.

=== Neighborhoods and areas ===
The city of Winston-Salem consists of 66 constituent neighborhoods, covering 25 ZIP codes. Winston-Salem is the 84th-largest city by area in the United States and the fifth-largest city in North Carolina by population.

==== Downtown ====
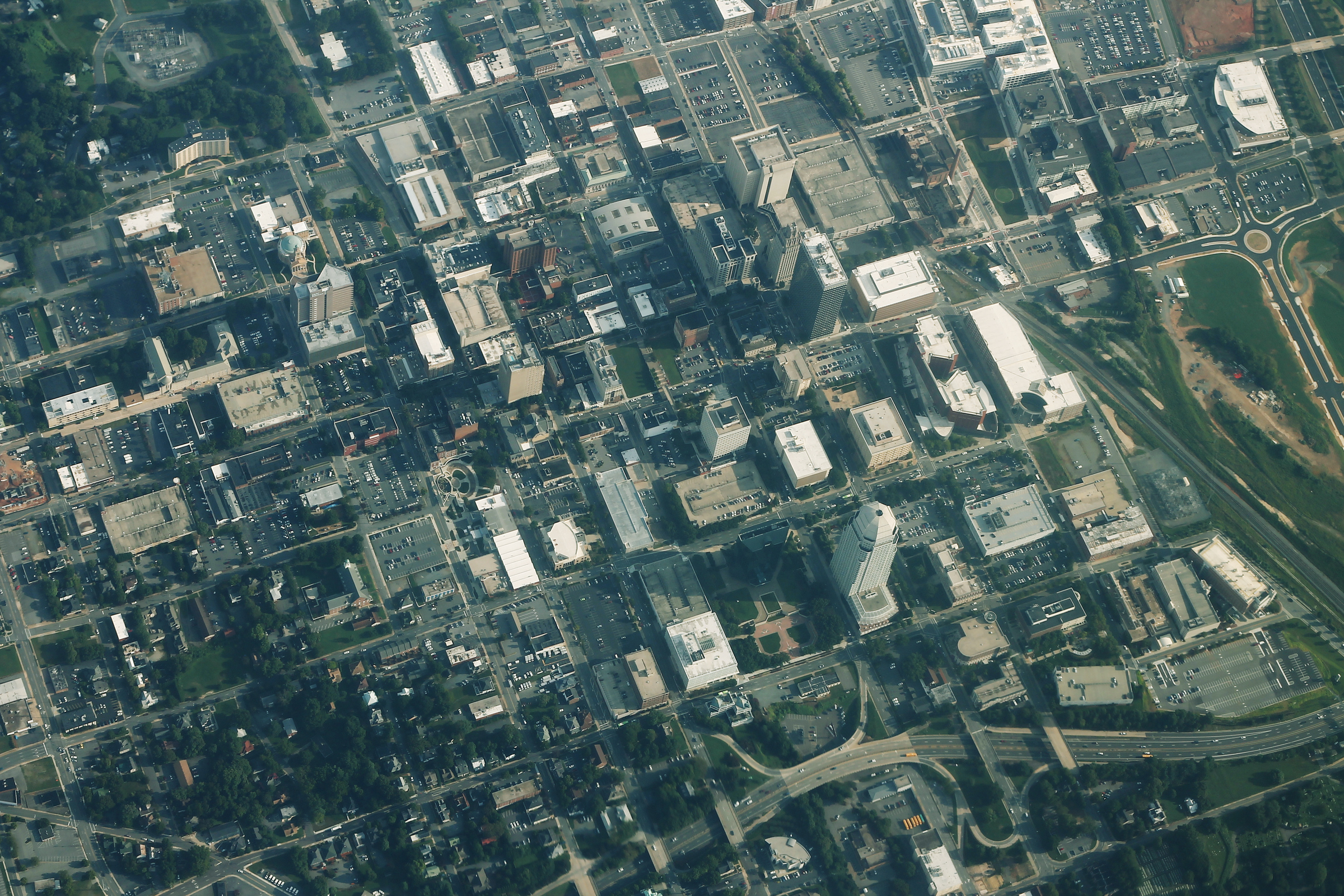
Aerial view of the center of Downtown Winston-Salem in 2013

Downtown, the central business district of Winston-Salem, is the largest in the Piedmont Triad region. With a population around 14,000 and a workforce over 27,000, downtown Winston-Salem is a hotspot for growth. Fourth Street, the "main drag", consists of bars, restaurants, retail, hotels, and luxury residential units. The area is surrounded by Northwest Boulevard to the north and west, Salem Parkway to the south, and U.S. Route 52 to the east. Downtown features attractions such as Innovation Quarter, Truist Stadium, Old Salem, and the Benton Convention Center.

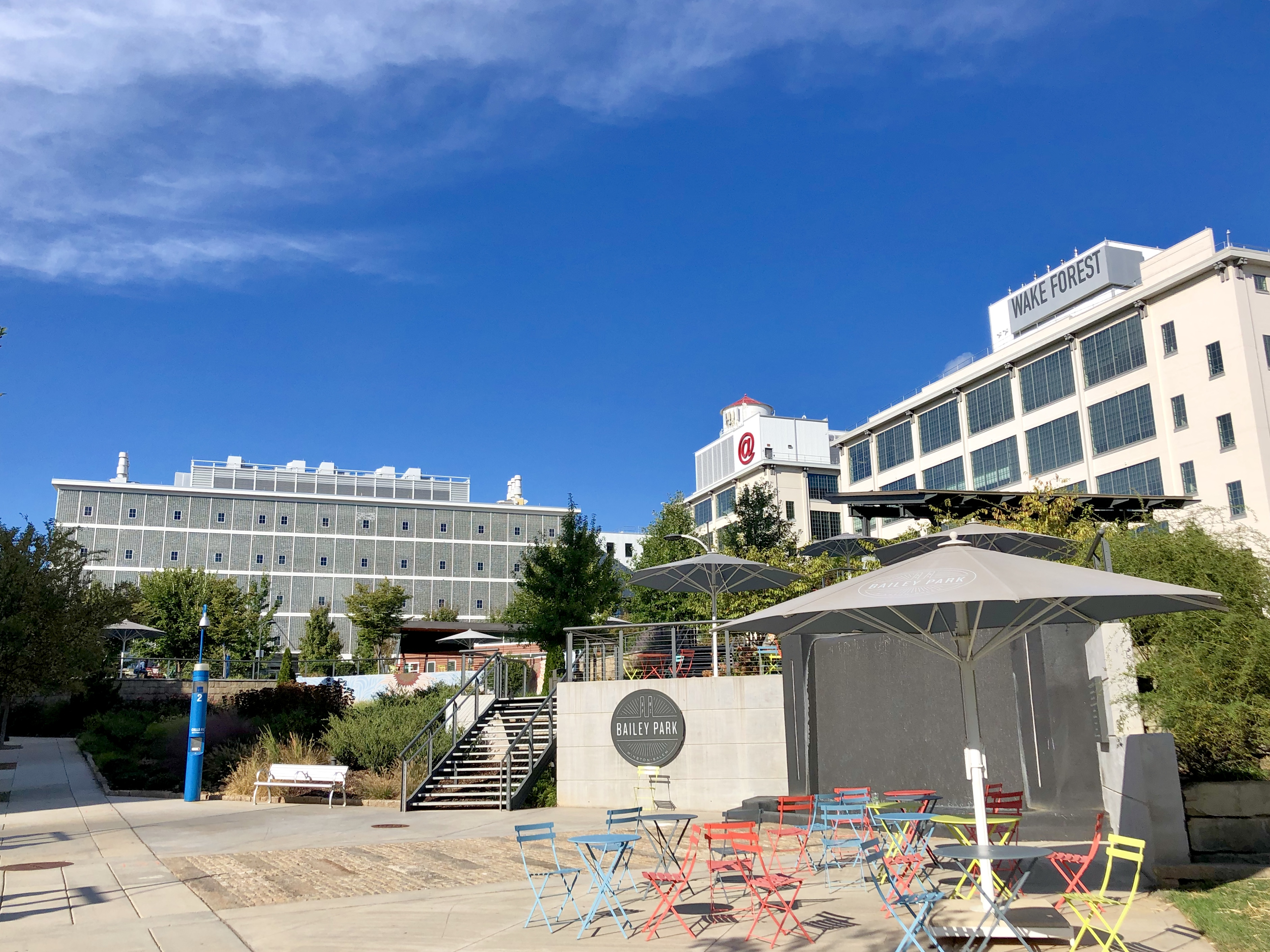
Bailey Park

==== West End ====
One of the most notable neighborhoods in the city, West End features the West End Historic District, which covers an area of 229 acres and is predominantly residential. Most of the buildings in West End were built between 1887 and 1930. Major thoroughfares in West End are West End Boulevard, Northwest Boulevard, and West First Street, which leads into downtown Winston-Salem. The neighborhood offers an urban lifestyle, with shops, parks, restaurants, and services all located within the neighborhood.

==== Ardmore ====
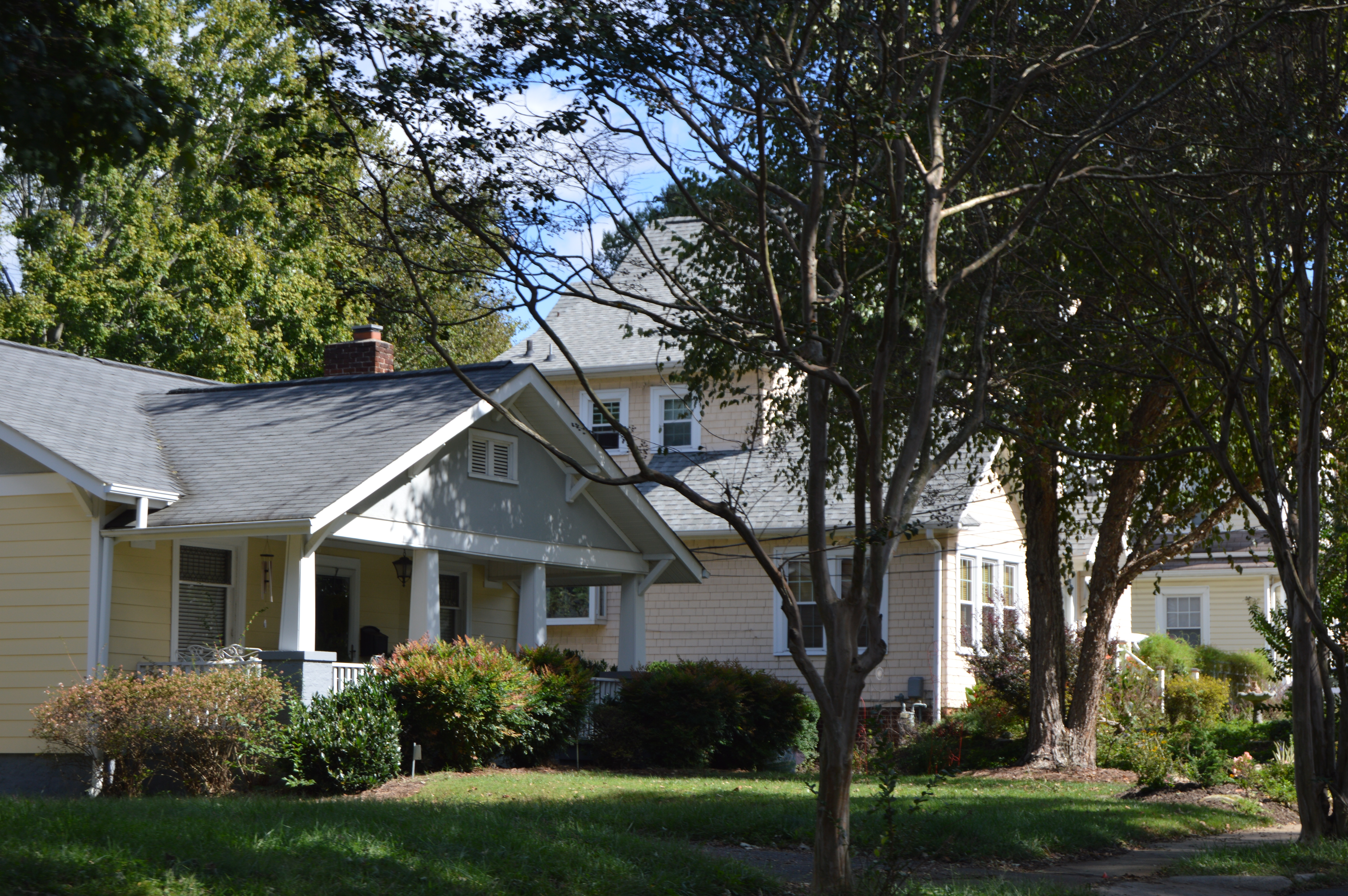
Westover Boulevard in the Ardmore Historic District

Ardmore, the largest neighborhood in Winston-Salem, features the Ardmore Historic District, which contains over 2,000 buildings and two sites. Ardmore is near Wake Forest Baptist Medical Center, the second-largest hospital in North Carolina. Wake Forest Baptist Health is the largest employer in Forsyth County, with over 13,000 employees, and serves North Carolina, Virginia, Tennessee, and South Carolina. Major thoroughfares in Ardmore are South Hawthorne Road, Miller Street, Cloverdale Avenue, and Queen Street.

==== Buena Vista ====
Sitting northwest of downtown, Buena Vista is close to a wide range of activities and services, such as the Reynolda House and Reynolda Gardens. It is known around Winston-Salem for its quiet, tree-lined streets, which give it an "exclusive" feel; most homes in Buena Vista cost between $600,000 and several million dollars. The neighborhood is about ten minutes from downtown and five minutes from one of the city's upscale shopping centers, Thruway. Thruway Center features national chains such as Trader Joe's, Athleta, and J.Crew.

==== Hanes Mall Boulevard / Stratford Road ====
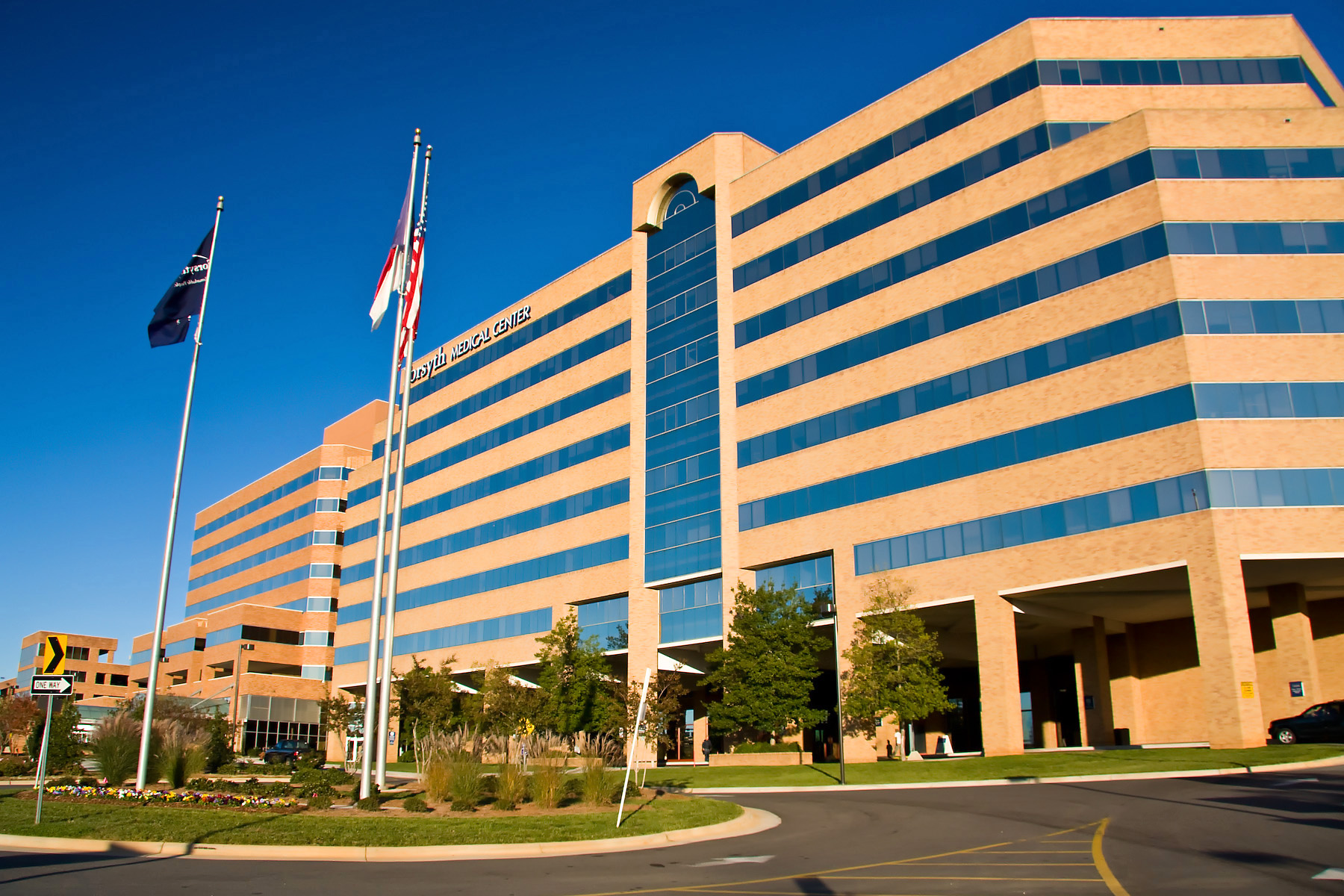
Novant Health Forsyth Medical Center in 2014

Located southwest of downtown as well as Hanes Mall, is a major shopping area, which includes a variety of big box retailers, commercial stores, and business spaces. The intersection of Hanes Mall Boulevard and Stratford Road is the second-busiest intersection in Winston-Salem, with the average daily traffic count of 54,000.

==== North Winston ====
North Winston is located three miles northeast of downtown, with Patterson Avenue running north to south and 25th Street serving as the east–west thoroughfare. The area is bound by University Parkway to the west and U.S. Route 52 to the east, stretching from 13th Street to 30th Street.

==== University area ====
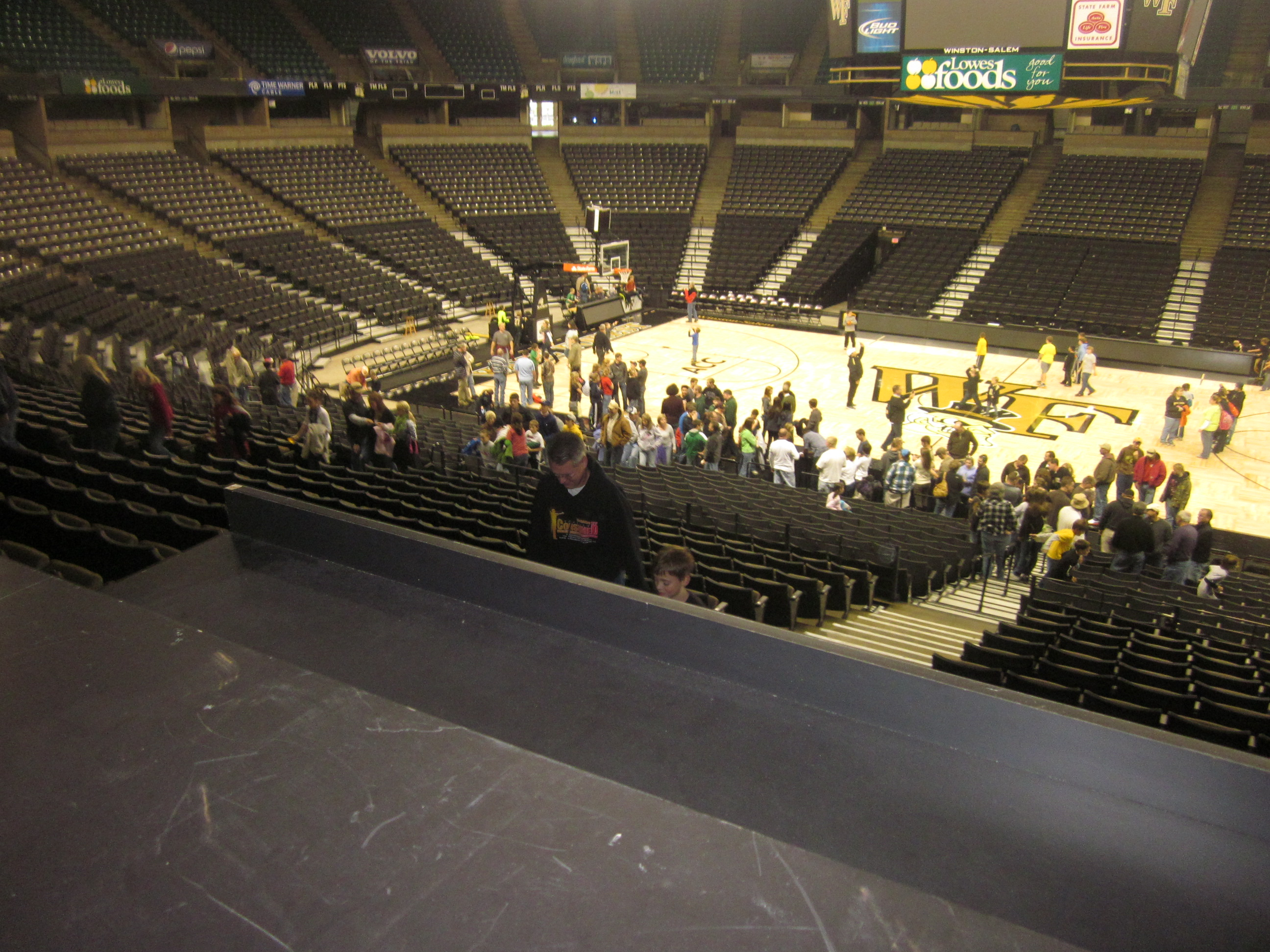
LJVM Coliseum

The university area is situated in the north-central and northwestern sections of the city, and contains some of Winston-Salem's busiest thoroughfares. University Parkway, the four- to eight-lane boulevard named after Wake Forest University, serves as the downtown–north connector. Neighborhoods within the area include Alspaugh and Mount Tabor. The area is bound by North Point Boulevard to the north, Coliseum Drive to the south, University Parkway to the east, and Silas Creek Parkway and Reynolda Road to the west. Other thoroughfares within the area are Polo Road, Reynolds Boulevard, and Deacon Boulevard. Attractions in the area include the Winston-Salem Entertainment-Sports Complex, which includes LJVM Coliseum, the Winston-Salem Fairgrounds, Winston-Salem Fairgrounds Annex, Truist Field, Truist Stadium, and David F. Couch Ballpark. The Winston-Salem Fairgrounds also hosts the Carolina Classic Fair, formerly the Dixie Classic Fair. The fair is one of the most-visited fairs in North America and the second-most-visited in North Carolina, next to the North Carolina State Fair.

==== Renovations ====
Community renovations are planned for the corner of Peters Creek Parkway and Academy Street. On September 11, 2018, the Winston-Salem Journal reported that the City of Winston-Salem Committee had approved the Peters Creek Community Initiative project, which is a collaboration of The Shalom Project, the North Carolina Housing Foundation, and The National Development Council. The group plans to purchase the former Budget Inn property and build 60 apartment units with a 4,000-square-foot community space. PCCI plans to build a four-story building that will house the Shalom Project in the bottom floor, along with other businesses.

=== Climate ===
Winston-Salem has a humid subtropical climate, characterized by cool winters and warm, humid summers. Throughout the year, temperatures typically stay between 32 °F (0 °C) and 88 °F (31 °C), rarely dropping below 19 °F (−7 °C) or exceeding 94 °F (34 °C). The Köppen climate classification subtype for this climate is Cfa. The average high temperatures range from around 49 °F (9 °C) in the winter to 89 °F (32 °C) in the summer. The average low temperatures range from around 28 °F (−2 °C) in the winter to 69 °F (21 °C) in the summer.

Climate data for Winston-Salem, North Carolina (Smith Reynolds Airport), 1991–2020 normals, extremes 1899–present
Month	Jan	Feb	Mar	Apr	May	Jun	Jul	Aug	Sep	Oct	Nov	Dec	Year
Record high °F (°C)	79 (26)	83 (28)	91 (33)	93 (34)	101 (38)	104 (40)	104 (40)	104 (40)	102 (39)	96 (36)	84 (29)	79 (26)	104 (40)
Mean daily maximum °F (°C)	48.8 (9.3)	52.8 (11.6)	60.8 (16.0)	70.6 (21.4)	77.9 (25.5)	84.9 (29.4)	88.0 (31.1)	86.1 (30.1)	80.1 (26.7)	70.6 (21.4)	60.1 (15.6)	51.7 (10.9)	69.4 (20.8)
Daily mean °F (°C)	39.8 (4.3)	43.0 (6.1)	50.4 (10.2)	59.4 (15.2)	67.5 (19.7)	75.1 (23.9)	78.6 (25.9)	77.0 (25.0)	70.6 (21.4)	59.9 (15.5)	49.6 (9.8)	42.6 (5.9)	59.5 (15.3)
Mean daily minimum °F (°C)	30.7 (−0.7)	33.2 (0.7)	40.1 (4.5)	48.3 (9.1)	57.0 (13.9)	65.4 (18.6)	69.2 (20.7)	67.9 (19.9)	61.2 (16.2)	49.3 (9.6)	39.1 (3.9)	33.6 (0.9)	49.6 (9.8)
Record low °F (°C)	−10 (−23)	−1 (−18)	10 (−12)	21 (−6)	30 (−1)	40 (4)	48 (9)	47 (8)	36 (2)	21 (−6)	7 (−14)	−3 (−19)	−10 (−23)
Average precipitation inches (mm)	3.35 (85)	3.89 (99)	3.60 (91)	3.71 (94)	3.76 (96)	3.64 (92)	4.24 (108)	4.51 (115)	3.86 (98)	3.28 (83)	3.06 (78)	3.30 (84)	43.20 (1,097)
Average precipitation days (≥ 0.01 in)	9.5	9.4	11.2	10.2	12.2	11.8	11.9	11.1	10.0	9.2	8.5	9.2	125.5
Source: NOAA

== Demographics ==
Historical population
Census	Pop.	Note	%±
1870	443		—
1880	4,194		846.7%
1890	10,729		155.8%
1900	13,650		27.2%
1910	22,700		66.3%
1920	48,395		113.2%
1930	75,274		55.5%
1940	79,815		6.0%
1950	87,881		10.1%
1960	111,135		26.5%
1970	133,683		20.3%
1980	131,885		−1.3%
1990	143,485		8.8%
2000	185,776		29.5%
2010	229,617		23.6%
2020	249,545		8.7%
2025 (est.)	257,271	▲	3.1%
U.S. Decennial Census; 2020

=== Racial and ethnic composition ===
Winston-Salem city, North Carolina – Racial and ethnic composition Note: the U.S. census treats Hispanic/Latino as an ethnic category. This table excludes Latinos from the racial categories and assigns them to a separate category. Hispanics/Latinos may be of any race.
Race / Ethnicity (NH = Non-Hispanic)	Pop 2000	Pop 2010	Pop 2020	% 2000	% 2010	% 2020
White alone (NH)	97,420	108,222	109,714	52.44%	47.13%	43.97%
Black or African American alone (NH)	67,648	78,065	79,788	36.41%	34.00%	31.97%
Native American or Alaska Native alone (NH)	453	567	607	0.24%	0.25%	0.24%
Asian alone (NH)	2,082	4,536	6,275	1.12%	1.98%	2.51%
Native Hawaiian or Pacific Islander alone (NH)	44	138	191	0.02%	0.06%	0.08%
Other race alone (NH)	267	535	1,140	0.14%	0.23%	0.46%
Mixed race or Multiracial (NH)	1,819	3,801	8,989	0.98%	1.66%	3.60%
Hispanic or Latino (any race)	16,043	33,753	42,841	8.64%	14.70%	17.17%
Total	185,776	229,617	249,545	100.00%	100.00%	100.00%

=== 2020 census ===
As of the 2020 census, there were 249,545 people, 94,884 households, and 53,708 families residing in the city.

Winston-Salem's population grew by 8.7% from 2010 to 2020, making it the fifth-largest city in North Carolina.

=== 2017 census estimate ===
At the 2017 census estimate, the population was 244,605, with 94,105 households and a population density of 1,846 people per square mile.

Winston-Salem was 53.0% female, and 27.8% of its firms were owned by women. The median age was 35 years. 23.9% of the population was under 18 years old, and 13.7% of the population was 65 years or older.

The racial composition of the city in 2017 was 56.1% White, 34.7% Black or African American, 2.2% Asian American, 0.3% Native American, 0.1% Native Hawaiian and other Pacific native alone, and 2.3% two or more races. In addition, 14.8% was Hispanic or Latino, of any race. Non-Hispanic Whites were 45.8% of the population in 2017.

38.4% were married couples living together, 17.3% had a female householder with no husband present, and 39.7% were non-families. 33.1% of all households were made up of individuals, and 10.3% had someone living alone who was 65 years of age or older. The average household size was 2.38 and the average family size was 3.06.

The median household income was $41,228, and the median family income was $53,222. The mean household income was $60,637, and the mean family income was $74,938. Males had a median income of $41,064, versus $33,683 for females. The per capita income for the city was $24,728. 20.6% of the population and 15.7% of all families were below the poverty line. 26.2% of the total population, 31.6% of those under the age of 18, and 8.2% of those 65 and older were living below the poverty line.

=== Religion ===
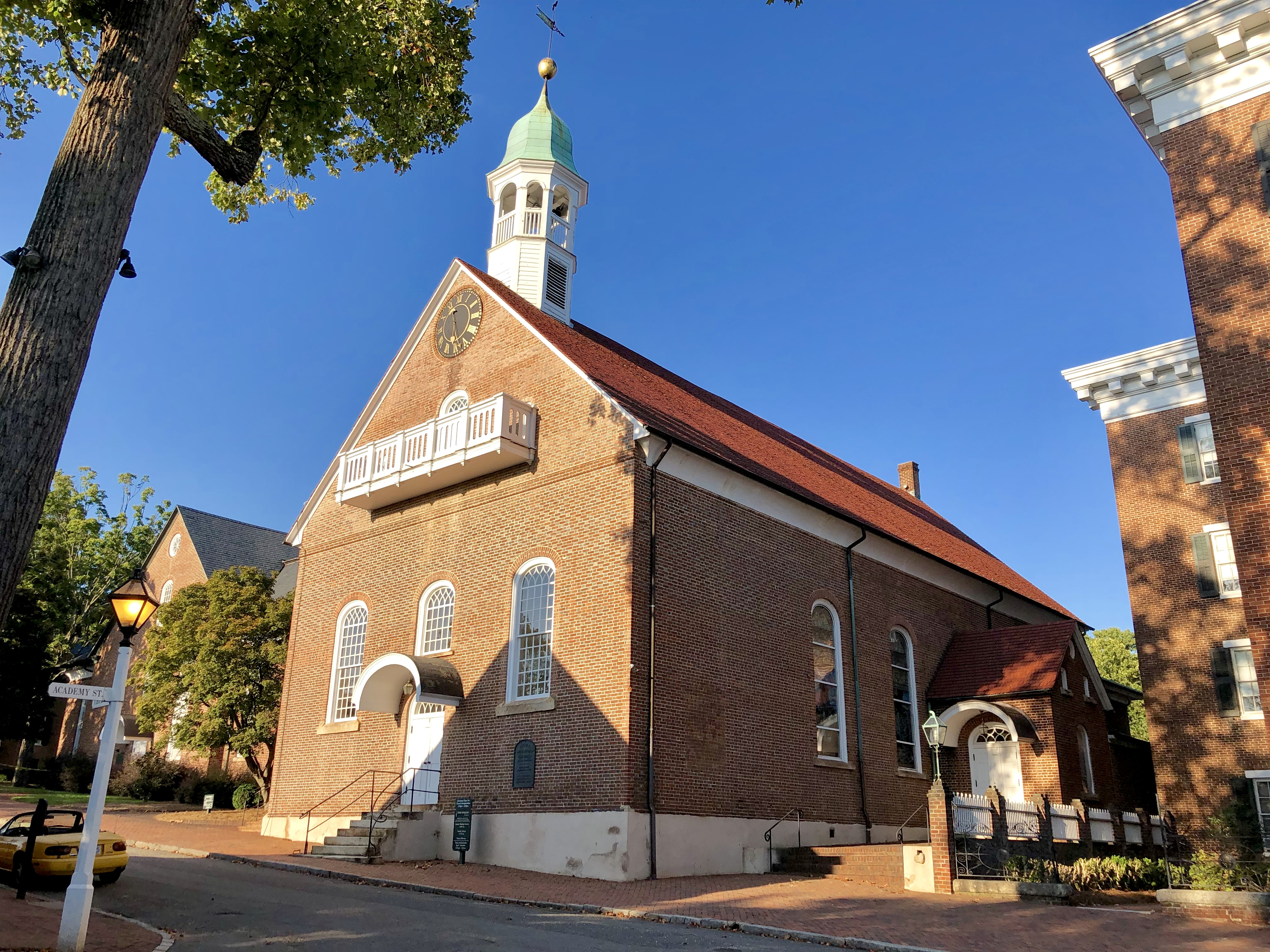
Home Moravian Church, Old Salem

About 54.14% of the population identifies as being religiously affiliated. Christianity is the largest religion, with Baptists (15.77%) making up the largest religious denomination, followed by Methodists (12.79%) and Catholics (4.39%). Pentecostals (2.97%), Episcopalians (1.3%), Presbyterians (2.59%), Lutherans (0.96%), Latter-Day Saints (0.90%) make up a significant amount of the Christian population as well. The remaining Christian population (11.93%) is affiliated with other churches such as the Moravians and the United Church of Christ. Islam (0.43%) is the second-largest religion, after Christianity, followed by Judaism (0.20%). Eastern religions (0.02%) make up the religious minority.

The city's long history with the Moravian church has had a lasting cultural effect. The Moravian star is used as the city's official Christmas street decoration. In addition, a 31-foot Moravian star, one of the largest in the world, sits atop the North Tower of Wake Forest Baptist Medical Center during the Advent and Christmas seasons. Another star sits under Wake Forest University's Wait Chapel during the Advent and Christmas seasons as well. Moravian star images also decorate the lobby of the city's landmark Reynolds Building.

== Economy ==
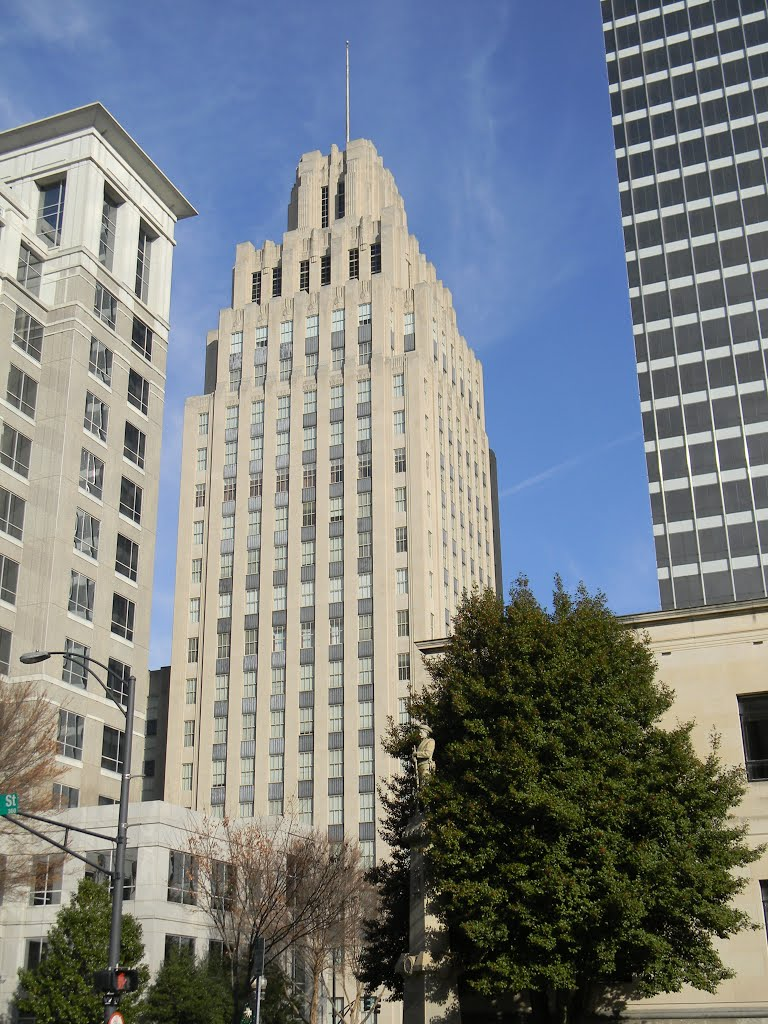
Former R.J. Reynolds headquarters, built in 1929

Winston-Salem is the location of the corporate headquarters of HanesBrands, Inc., Lowes Foods Stores, Quality Oil Company, Reynolds American (parent of R. J. Reynolds Tobacco Company), Reynolda Manufacturing Solutions, K&W Cafeterias (until 2022), and TW Garner Food Company (makers of Texas Pete). Blue Rhino, the nation's largest propane exchange company and a division of Ferrellgas, is also headquartered in Winston-Salem. Wachovia Corporation was based in Winston-Salem until it merged with First Union Corporation in September 2001; the corporate headquarters of the combined company was located in Charlotte, until the company was purchased by Wells Fargo in December 2008. PepsiCo has its customer service center located in Winston-Salem. BB&T was also based in Winston-Salem until it was merged with SunTrust Banks in December 2019; the corporate headquarters of the combined company were relocated to Charlotte.

Although traditionally associated with the textile and tobacco industries, Winston-Salem is transforming itself to be a leader in the nanotech, high-tech and biotech fields. Medical research is a fast-growing local industry, and Atrium Health Wake Forest Baptist is the largest employer in Winston-Salem. In December 2004, the city entered into a deal with Dell, providing millions of dollars in incentives to build a computer assembly plant nearby in southeastern Forsyth County. Dell closed its Winston-Salem facility in January 2010 due to the poor economy. In January 2015, Herbalife opened a manufacturing facility in the space left vacant by Dell.

Public and private investment of $713 million has created the Wake Forest Innovation Quarter, an innovation district in downtown Winston-Salem which features business, education in biomedical research and engineering, information technology and digital media, as well as public gathering spaces, apartment living, restaurants, and community events.

=== Innovation ===
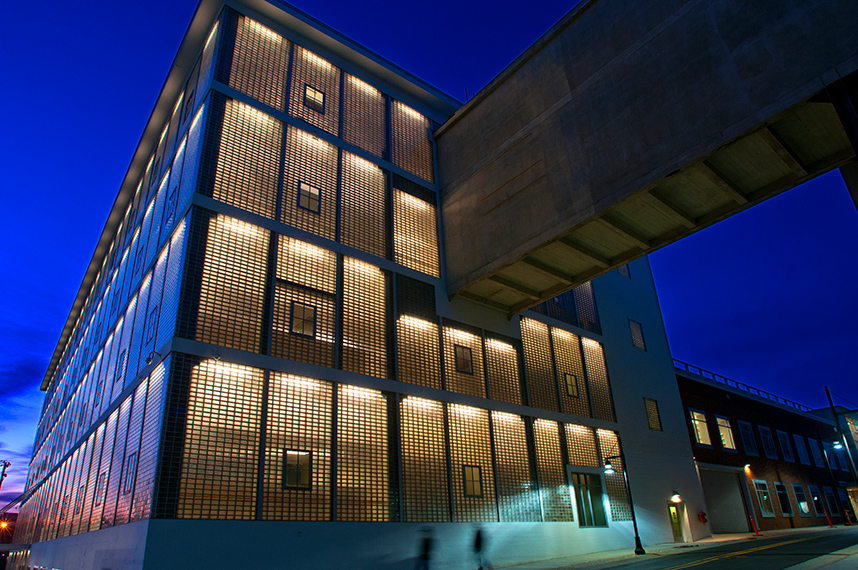
Wake Forest Biotech Place in the Innovation Quarter

The east end of downtown Winston-Salem is anchored by the Innovation Quarter, one of the fastest-growing urban-based districts in the United States. Governed by the Wake Forest School of Medicine, the Innovation Quarter is home to 90 companies, over 3,600 workers, 1,800 students seeking a college degree, and more than 8,000 workforce trainees. The Innovation Quarter is a place for research, business, biomedical science, digital media, and clinical services. It consists of over 1,900,000 square feet (180,000 m^{2}) feet of office, laboratory, and educational space covering more than 330 acres (130 hectares). There are more than 1,000 residential units within the Innovation Quarter. The goal is to drive even more economic development and create programs for tenants and residents for new ideas. Because of its location in downtown Winston-Salem, the Innovation Quarter serves as a creative and welcoming urban place for scientists, innovators, and technology leaders. In 2019, the Innovation Quarter became one of the first nine steering committee members of the Global Institute on Innovation Districts, making it one of the leading districts of its kind in the world.

=== Shopping ===
Winston-Salem is home to Hanes Mall, which is located off of I-40 and is one of the largest shopping malls in North Carolina.

Other notable shopping areas exist in the city, including Thruway Center (the city's first shopping center), Hanes Point Shopping Center, Hanes Commons, Stratford Commons, Stratford Village, Reynolda Village, Pavilions, Shoppes at Hanestowne Village, Burke Mill Village Shopping Center, Oak Summit Shopping Center, Stone's Throw Plaza, Cloverdale Plaza Shopping Center Silas Creek Crossing, and the Marketplace Mall.

== Arts and culture ==
=== Historic districts ===
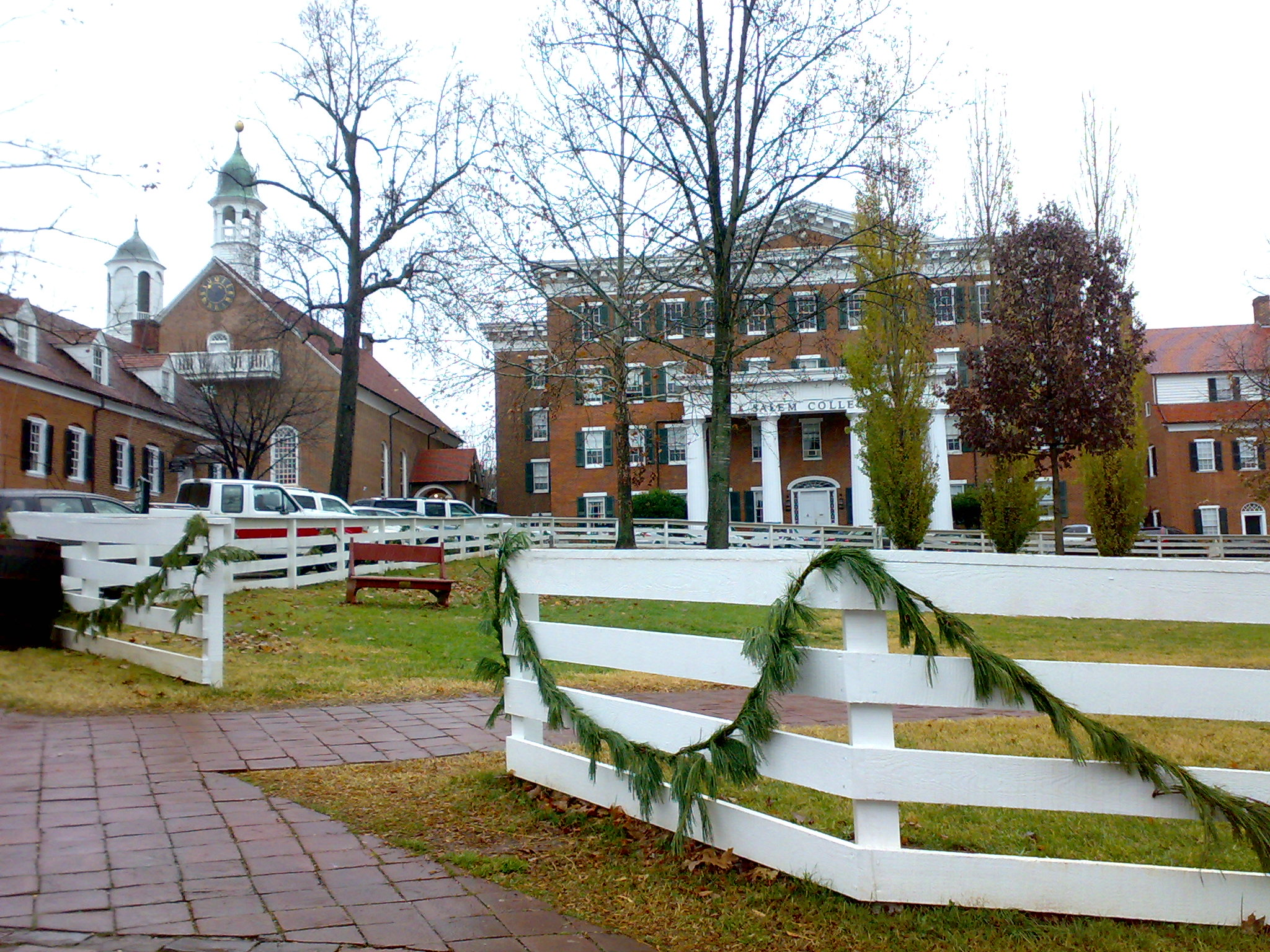
Salem College is located at the heart of Old Salem, a restored Moravian settlement

Old Salem is a restored Moravian settlement founded in 1766. Seventy percent of the buildings are original, and the village is a living history museum with skilled tinsmiths, blacksmiths, cobblers, gunsmiths, bakers and carpenters practicing their trades while interacting with visitors. Along with the original 18th-century buildings, Old Salem is also home to the Museum of Early Southern Decorative Arts (MESDA), a gallery of 18th- and early 19th-century furniture, ceramics, and textiles. In addition, Old Salem hosts the Cobblestone Farmers Market every Saturday during the spring season through early autumn. The market is dedicated to providing the public access to sustainably grown food and products.

Bethabara Historic District is a site where Moravians from Pennsylvania first settled in North Carolina. The 195-acre (0.79 km^{2}) area includes a museum and a Moravian church and offers hiking, birdwatching and many varieties of trees and plants.

=== Museums ===
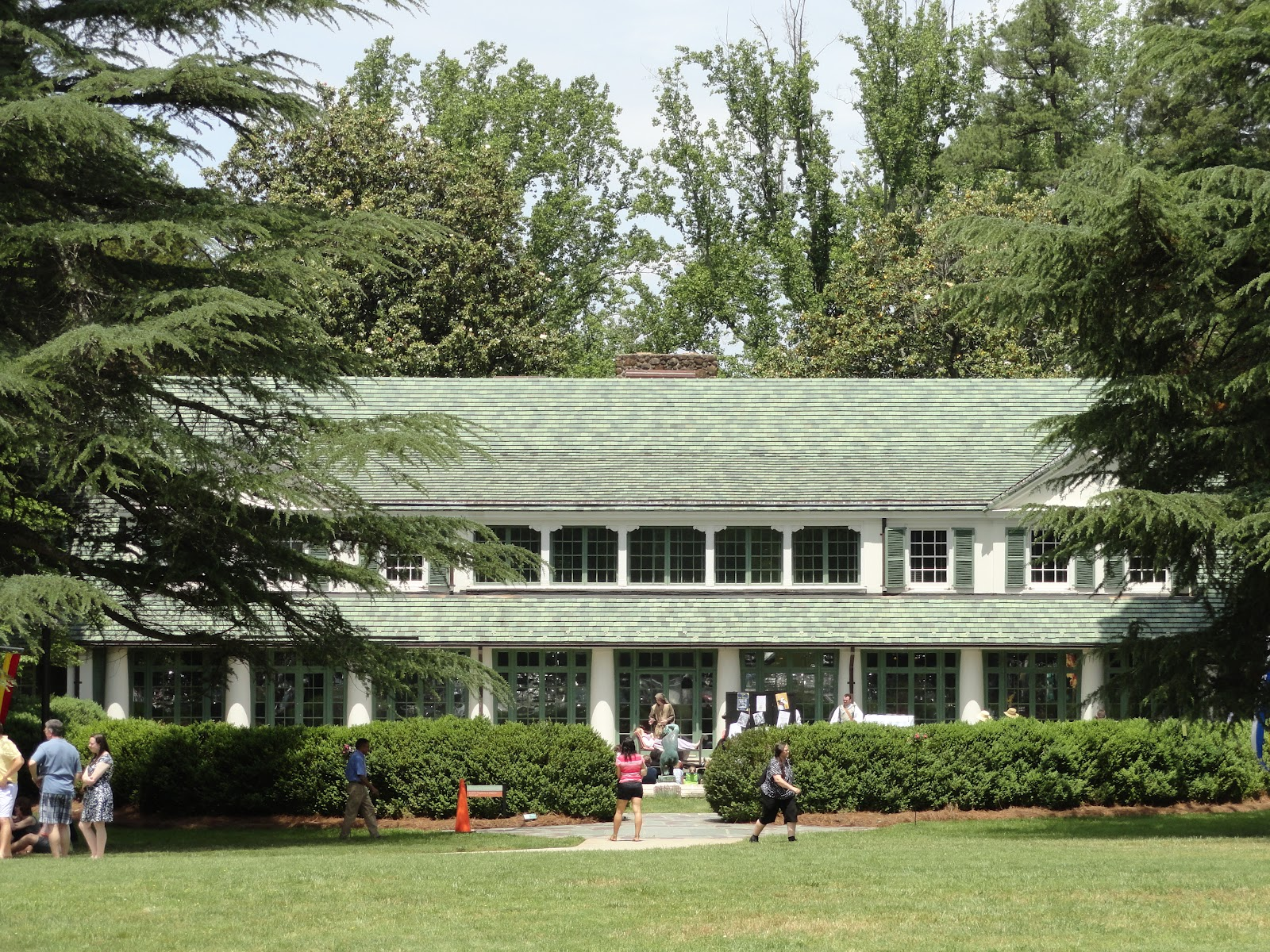
Reynolda House Museum of American Art

The Reynolda House Museum of American Art features collections from the colonial period to the present day. The museum was built in 1917 by Katherine Smith Reynolds and her husband R. J. Reynolds. The facility became an art museum in 1967 and first started as a center for education and arts in 1965. Behind the house is a 16-acre lake called "Lake Katherine", which was reverted into wetlands and has a wide variety of wildlife. Many of buildings were changed into shops, boutiques, and restaurants that still operate today. This house still is a main attraction in Winston-Salem.

NCMA Winston-Salem, formerly the Southeastern Center for Contemporary Art (SECCA), is a contemporary art museum founded in 1956. It became an affiliate of the North Carolina Museum of Art and a division of the North Carolina Department of Natural and Cultural Resources in 2007.

Kaleideum is an interactive children's museum which offers exhibits and programs designed to develop creative thinking, strengthen language skills, and encourage curiosity for children. It was formed through a merger of two older museums, the Children's Museum of Winston-Salem and SciWorks. The new four-story building opened in downtown Winston-Salem on February 17, 2024, and featured both old exhibits from the previous museums, as well as new exhibits and halls, a rooftop playground, and an updated planetarium

MUSE Winston-Salem, formerly the New Winston Museum, is a local-history organization for Winston-Salem and Forsyth County. It adopted its current name in 2020 and announced plans that year to develop a permanent museum in the former U.S. Bankruptcy Court building on South Liberty Street.

The Timothy S. Y. Lam Museum of Anthropology at Wake Forest University collects, preserves, and exhibits archaeological artifacts, ethnographic objects, and visual arts from cultures around the world. The museum adopted its current name in 2021.

One of seven original Shell Service Stations was opened by Quality Oil Company in 1930.

=== Arts and music ===
The city created the first arts council in the United States (Arts Council of Winston-Salem Forsyth County), founded in 1949, because of the local art schools and attractions. These include the University of North Carolina School of the Arts, The Little Theatre of W-S, Winston-Salem Theatre Alliance, Spirit Gum Theatre Co., the Piedmont Opera Theater, the Winston-Salem Symphony, the Stevens Center for the Performing Arts, the Downtown Arts District, the Milton Rhodes Center for the Arts, the Hanesbrands Theater, Piedmont Craftsmen, and the Sawtooth School for Visual Arts.

The city's Arts District is centered around Sixth and Trade Streets, where there are many galleries, restaurants and workshops; nearby is also the ARTivity on the Green art park, established by Art for Art's Sake. Winston-Salem is also home to NCMA Winston-Salem and the Reynolda House Museum of American Art (the restored 1917 mansion built by the founder of the R. J. Reynolds Tobacco Company and now affiliated with Wake Forest University). Winston-Salem is also the home of the Art-o-mat and houses nine of them throughout the city.

The city plays host to the National Black Theatre Festival, the RiverRun International Film Festival, and the Reynolda Film Festival.

Drive-In Studio, a recording studio owned by Mitch Easter, former guitarist for The dB's and Let's Active, was in operation between 1980 and 1994. With the recording equipment set up in his parents' garage, Easter's studio became an important part of the early indie rock scene of North Carolina. R.E.M. recorded its debut EP, Chronic Town, at the Drive-In in 1981, while other artists who recorded there include Pylon ("Beep"), Suzanne Vega ("Gypsy"), Game Theory (The Big Shot Chronicles) and The Connells (Boylan Heights).

Baity's Backstreet Music Garden, a popular live-music venue, once stood on Baity Street, at its former intersection with 30th Street. Owned by Tim Mabe, the venue was established in 1982. It burned down in 1993. Artists who played there include the Ramones, R.E.M., Guns N' Roses and Blue Öyster Cult.

The city is also home to Carolina Music Ways, a grassroots arts organization focusing on the area's diverse, interconnected music traditions, including bluegrass, blues, jazz, gospel, old-time stringband, and Moravian music. Once a year the city is also the home of the Heavy Rebel Weekender music festival, featuring over 70 bands, primarily rockabilly, punk and honky tonk, over three days.

=== Movies filmed in Winston-Salem ===
- The Bedroom Window (1987)
- Mr. Destiny (1990)
- Eddie (1996)
- The Lottery, made-for-television adaptation of Shirley Jackson's short story (1996)
- George Washington (2000)
- "Brand X", X-Files, episode involving the tobacco industry (2000)
- A Union in Wait (2001, documentary)
- Junebug (2005)
- Lost Stallions: The Journey Home (2008)
- Goodbye Solo (2008)
- Leatherheads (2008)
- Eyeborgs (2009)
- The 5th Quarter (2010)
- Are You Here (2013)
- Goodbye to All That (2014)
- The Longest Ride (2014)

== Parks and recreation ==
Reynolda Gardens is a 4-acre (16,000 m^{2}) formal garden set within a larger woodland site, originally part of the R. J. Reynolds country estate.

Tanglewood Park is a recreation center located on the Yadkin River inside Clemmons adjacent along Bermuda Run, featuring a pool, lazy river, tennis courts, paddle boats, golf, walking trails, and other recreation. Tanglewood Park also hosts the Festival of Lights every year, a drive-through light show that celebrates the holidays.

The Winston-Salem Fairgrounds Annex is an event venue that hosts the Carolina Classic Fair (formerly Dixie Classic Fair) every year in autumn. The fair is located across from the Lawrence Joel Coliseum. In 2007 it had a record-breaking attendance, with over 371,000 visitors. The Winston-Salem Fairgrounds also holds hundreds of events and has a capacity of 7,000.

Salem Lake is located in southeastern Winston-Salem. Salem Lake features a seven-mile dirt trail, a lake, and wildlife. The walking trail offers an abundance of activities such as hiking, walking, fishing, biking, dog leashing, running, and more. Salem Lake is often referred to as the "hidden diamond in the city".

== Sports ==
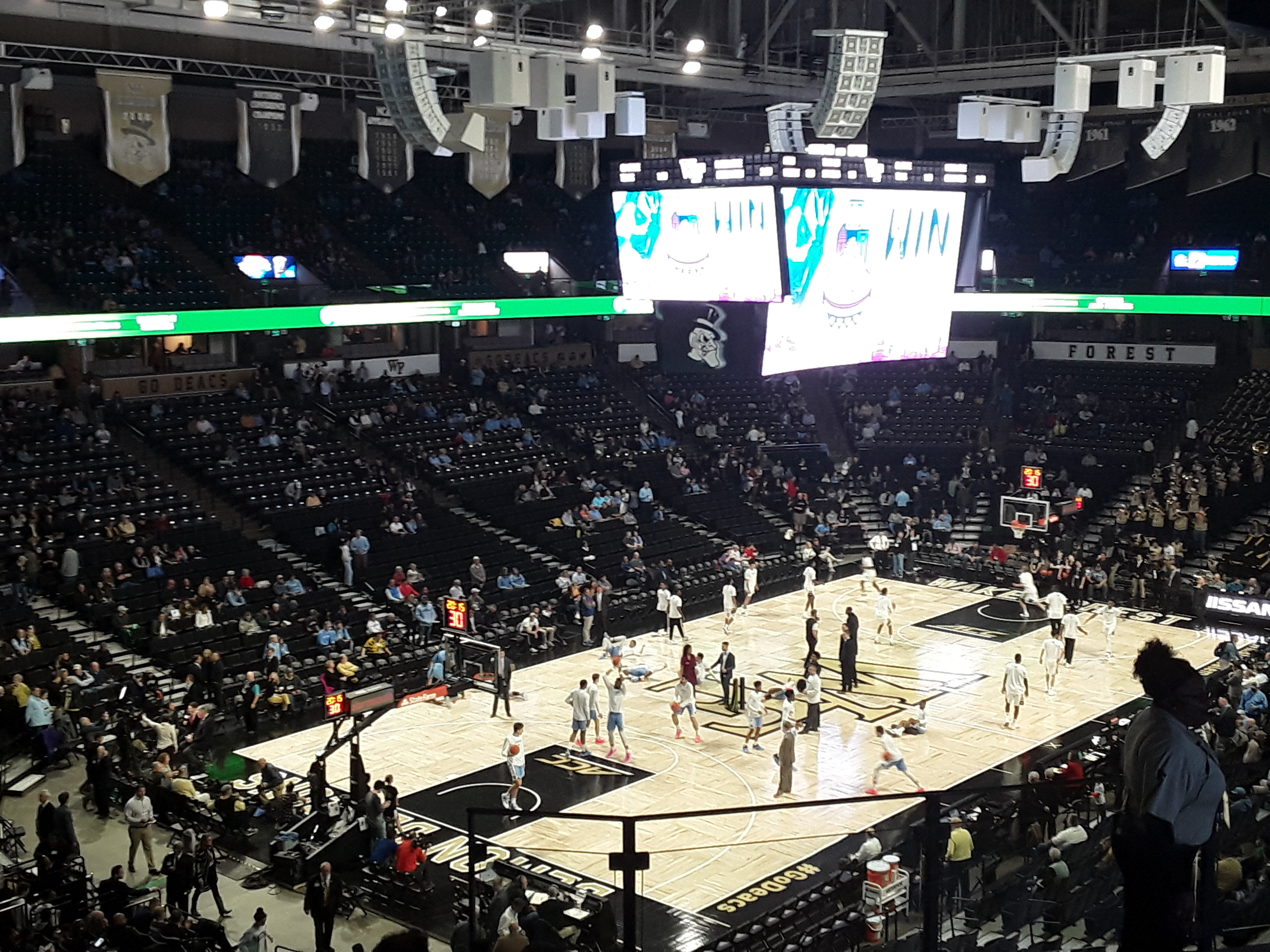
Lawrence Joel Veterans Memorial Coliseum home to Wake Forest Demon Deacons men's basketball and Wake Forest Demon Deacons women's basketball

Team	Sport	League	Venue
Winston-Salem State University Rams	Men's & Women's Basketball	NCAA	C. E. Gaines Center
Winston-Salem State University Rams	American Football	NCAA	Bowman Gray Stadium
Winston-Salem State University Rams	Softball	NCAA	Washington Park
Winston-Salem State University Rams	Tennis	NCAA	WSSU Tennis Center
Winston-Salem State University Rams	Track & Field	NCAA	Civitan Park
Winston-Salem Dash	Baseball	SAL	Truist Stadium
Twin City Thunderbirds	Ice Hockey	FPHL	Winston-Salem Fairgrounds Arena
Winston-Salem Wolves	Basketball	East Coast Basketball League	Childress Center
Wake Forest football	American football	NCAA	Truist Field at Wake Forest
Wake Forest basketball	Basketball	NCAA	LJVM Coliseum

The Winston-Salem State University Rams have men's and women's NCAA Division II sports teams, which are members of the Central Intercollegiate Athletic Association (CIAA).

The Winston-Salem Dash are a Class High-A Minor-League baseball team currently affiliated with the Chicago White Sox. After 52 years at historic Ernie Shore Field, the Dash now play their home games at the new Truist Stadium, which opened in 2010. Previous names for the team include the Winston-Salem Cardinals, Twins, Red Sox, Spirits and, most recently, the Winston-Salem Warthogs. Players have included Vinegar Bend Mizell, Rico Petrocelli, Wade Boggs, Carlos Lee, Joe Crede, Jon Garland, and Aaron Rowand, all of whom have played extensively at the major-league level.

The Twin City Thunderbirds minor-league hockey team began play as the Carolina Thunderbirds in 2017 at the Winston-Salem Fairgrounds Arena. The franchise adopted its current name in September 2025.

Wake Forest University is an original member of the Atlantic Coast Conference (ACC). Wake Forest's football team plays its games at Truist Field at Wake Forest (formerly BB&T Field, and Groves Stadium), which seats 32,500. Wake Forest's soccer program made four consecutive final four appearances (2006–2009) and were NCAA champions in 2007.

The Lawrence Joel Veterans Memorial Coliseum is home to Wake Forest and some Winston-Salem State basketball games.

NASCAR Whelen All-American Series racing takes place from March until August at Bowman Gray Stadium. The K&N Pro Series East also races here. It is NASCAR's longest-running racing series, dating to the 1940s. In the fall, the stadium is used for Winston-Salem State Rams football games.

Winston-Salem hosts an ATP tennis tournament every year, the Winston-Salem Open. The matches are played at the Wake Forest tennis center.

== Government ==
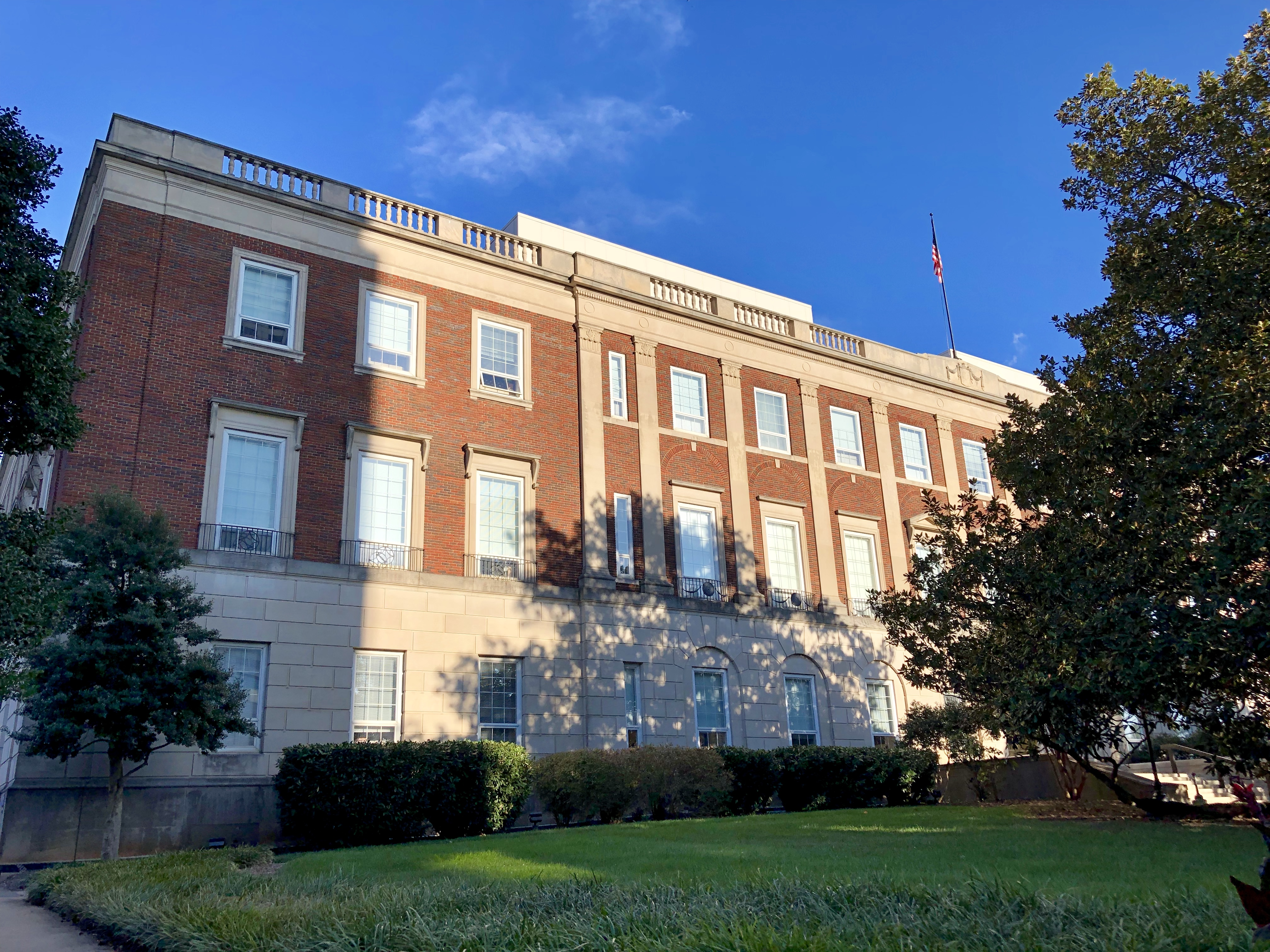
Winston-Salem City Hall

=== Local government ===
The governing body for the City of Winston-Salem is an eight-member City Council (called the Board of Aldermen until December 2002). Voters go to the polls every four years in November to elect the mayor and council. The mayor is elected at large; council members are elected by citizens in each of the eight wards within the city. The City Council is responsible for adopting and providing for all ordinances, rules and regulations as necessary for the general welfare of the city. It approves the city budget and sets property taxes and user fees. The council appoints the city manager and city attorney, and approves appointments to city boards and commissions.

As of August 2026, the mayor of Winston-Salem is Allen Joines (D), who was first elected in 2001 and is the longest-serving mayor in the city's history. William Patrick "Pat" Pate has served as city manager since November 6, 2023.

==== Emergency services ====
The city of Winston-Salem is patrolled by the Winston-Salem Police Department and the Forsyth County Sheriff's Department. The chief of police is William H. Penn, and the sheriff is Bobby F. Kimbrough Jr. Fire protection is provided by the Winston-Salem Fire Department, and the chief of the department is William "Trey" Mayo.

== Education ==
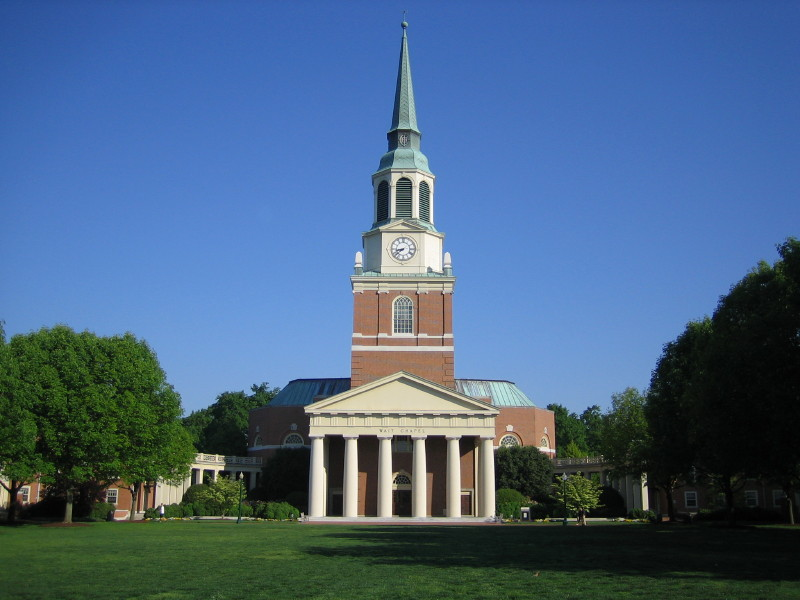
Wait Chapel at Wake Forest University

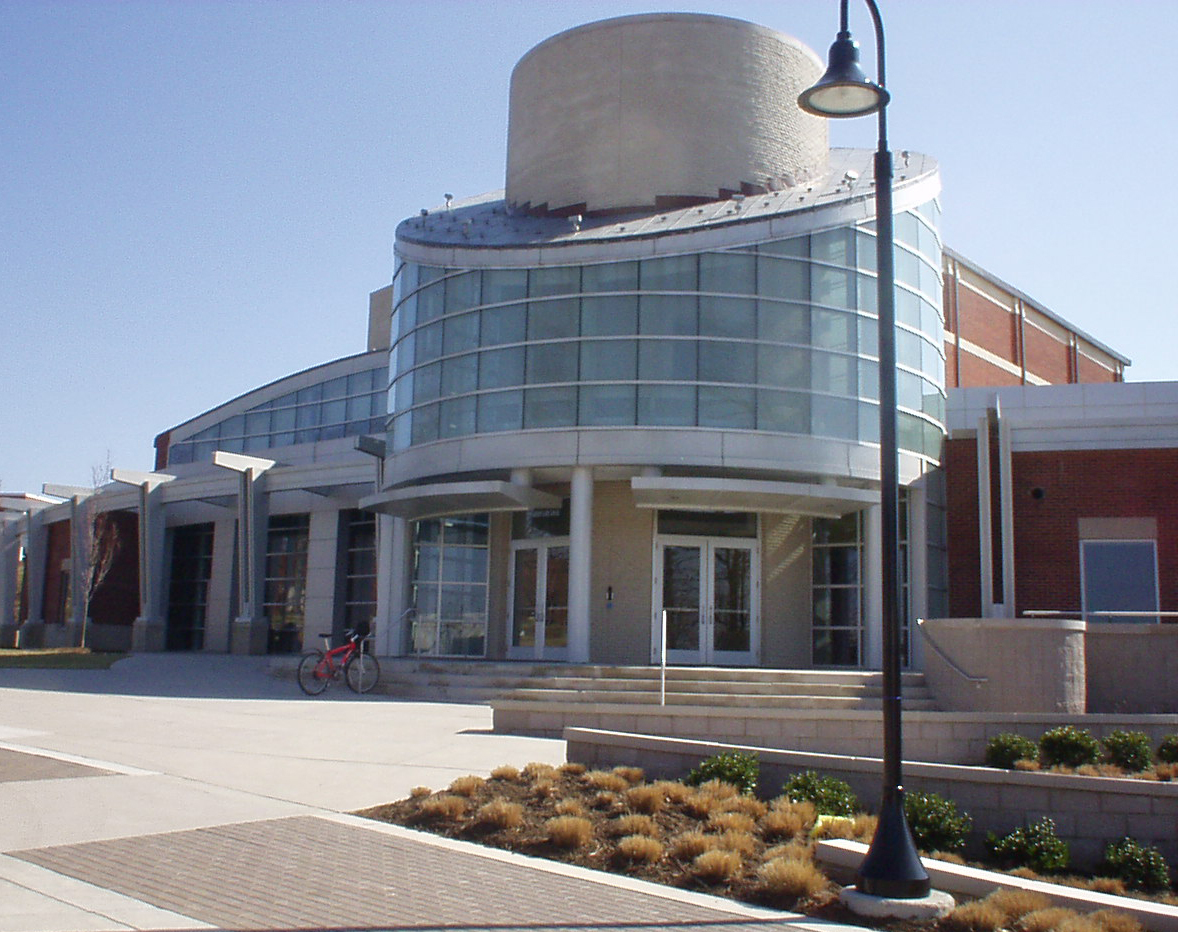
Watson Hall at University of North Carolina School of the Arts

=== Primary and secondary ===
Winston-Salem/Forsyth County Schools has most of its schools inside Winston-Salem. WS/FC Schools include 51 elementary schools, 25 middle schools and 13 high schools. The school with the largest student body population is West Forsyth High School, with over 2,400 students as of the 2017–2018 school year. The district is the most diverse school system in North Carolina. Winston-Salem/Forsyth County School System is the fourth-largest school system in North Carolina, with about 59,000 students and over 90 schools operating in the district.

Private and parochial schools also make up a significant portion of Winston-Salem's educational establishment. Catholic elementary schools include St. Leo The Great and Our Lady of Mercy. Protestant Christian schools include Winston-Salem Christian School, Calvary Day School (Baptist), Gospel Light Christian School, Salem Baptist Christian School, Redeemer School (Presbyterian), St. John's Lutheran, Cedar Forest Christian School, Winston-Salem Street School, Salem Montessori School, Berean Baptist Christian School and Woodland Baptist Christian School. Until 2001, Winston-Salem was home to Bishop McGuinness Catholic High School.

Forsyth Country Day School (in nearby Lewisville, North Carolina) and Summit School are secular private schools that serve the area. Salem Academy, located in Old Salem, has been providing education to young women since 1772.

=== Postsecondary ===
Winston-Salem has a number of colleges and universities. Public institutions include Forsyth Technical Community College; Winston-Salem State University, a historically black university founded in 1892; and University of North Carolina School of the Arts, the first public arts conservatory in the U.S.

Amongst private institutions is Wake Forest University, a four-year private research university which was founded in 1834 and moved to Winston-Salem in 1956. Other private colleges include Carolina Christian College, Carolina University, Living Arts Institute, and Salem College, the oldest continuously operating educational institution for women in America, which was founded in 1772.

== Media ==
=== Newspapers ===
The Winston-Salem Journal is the main daily newspaper in Winston-Salem. Yes! Weekly is a free paper covering news, opinion, arts, entertainment, music, movies and food. Triad City Beat is a free weekly paper in the Triad area that covers Winston-Salem. The Winston-Salem Chronicle is a weekly newspaper that focuses on the African American community.

=== Radio stations ===
These radio stations are located in Winston-Salem, and are listed by call letters, station number, and name. Many more radio stations can be picked up in Winston-Salem that are not located in town.

- WFDD, 88.5 FM, Wake Forest University (NPR Affiliate)
- WBFJ, 89.3 FM, Your Family Station (Contemporary Christian music)
- WSNC, 90.5 FM, Winston-Salem State University (Jazz)
- WXRI, 91.3 FM, Southern Gospel
- WSJS, 600 AM, News-Talk Radio
- WTRU, 830 AM, The Truth (Religious)
- WPIP, 880 AM, Berean Christian School
- WTOB, 980 AM, Classic Hits
- WPOL, 1340 AM, The Light Gospel Music (simulcast on 103.5 FM)
- WWNT, 1380 AM, Top 40 Oldies
- WSMX, 1500 AM, Oldies, Carolina Beach
- WBFJ, 1550 AM, Christian Teaching & Talk Radio
- Wake Radio, Wake Forest University's online, student-run radio station

=== Television stations ===
Winston-Salem makes up part of the Greensboro/Winston-Salem/High Point television designated market area. These stations are listed by call letters, channel number, network and city of license.

- Spectrum News 1 North Carolina, cable only
- WFMY-TV, 2, CBS, Greensboro
- WGHP, 8, Fox, High Point
- WXII-TV, 12, NBC, Winston-Salem
- WGPX, 16, Ion, Burlington
- WCWG, 20, CW, Lexington
- WUNL-TV, 26, PBS/UNC-TV, Winston-Salem
- WLXI-TV, 43, TCT, Greensboro
- WXLV-TV, 45, ABC, Winston-Salem
- WMYV, 48, My, Greensboro

== Infrastructure ==
=== Public transportation ===
Map of Winston-Salem Transit Authority in 2019

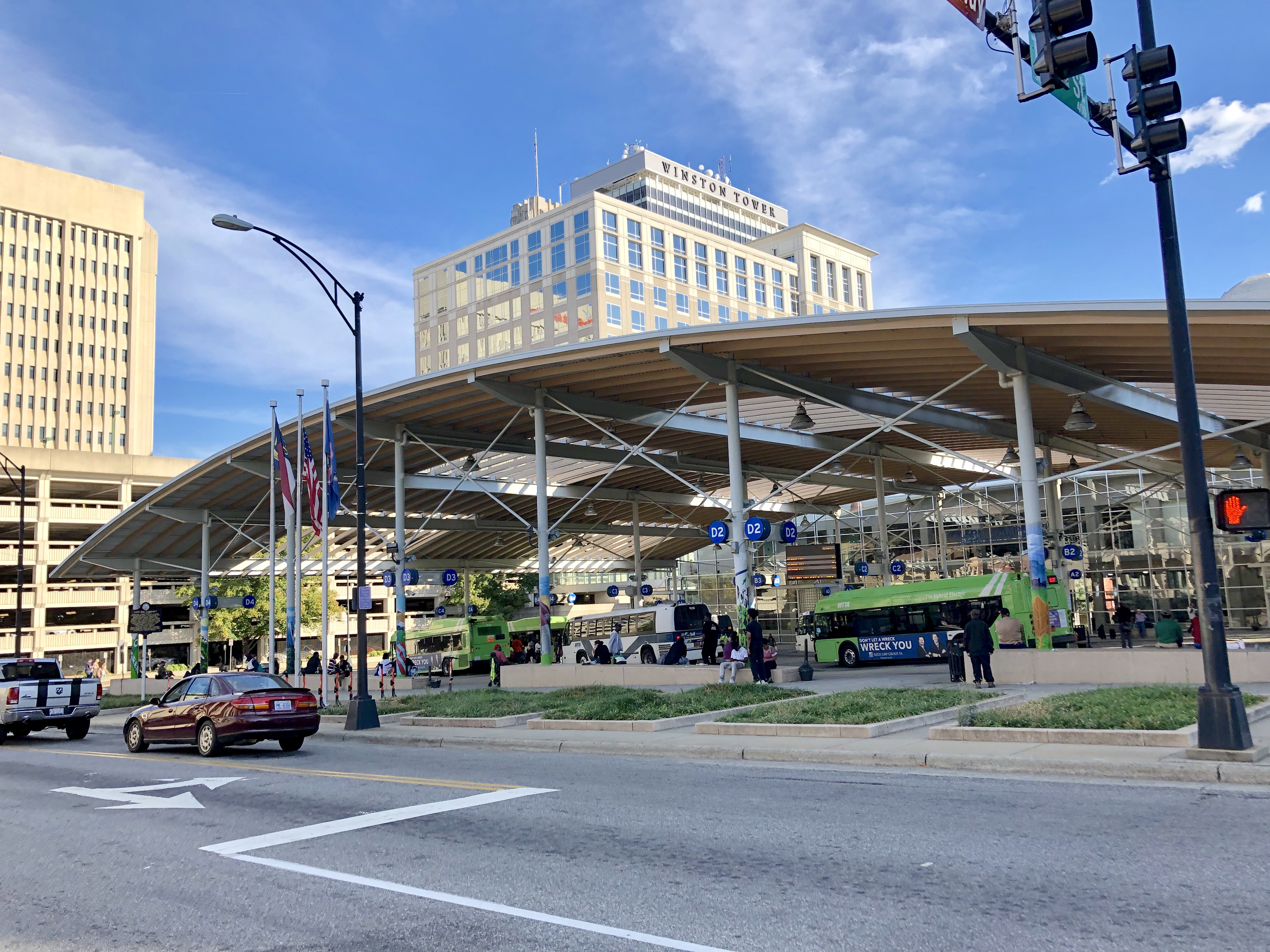
Central Bus Terminal for Winston-Salem Transit Authority

The Winston-Salem Transit Authority (WSTA) has the responsibility of providing public transportation. It took over from the Safe Bus Company, founded in the 1920s as the largest black-owned transportation company in the United States, in 1972. The WSTA mainly operates out of the Clark Campbell Transportation Center, located at 100 West Fifth Street, and in total, runs 33 bus routes. In 2025, the total ridership of the system was 1.3 million.

The Piedmont Authority for Regional Transportation (PART) operates a daily schedule from the Campbell Center connecting Winston-Salem to Boone, Mt. Airy, High Point and Greensboro, where other systems provide in-state routes to points east. PART also offers Route 5 (the Amtrak Connector), which provides daily service to and from the Amtrak station in High Point multiple times during the day.

=== Thoroughfares ===
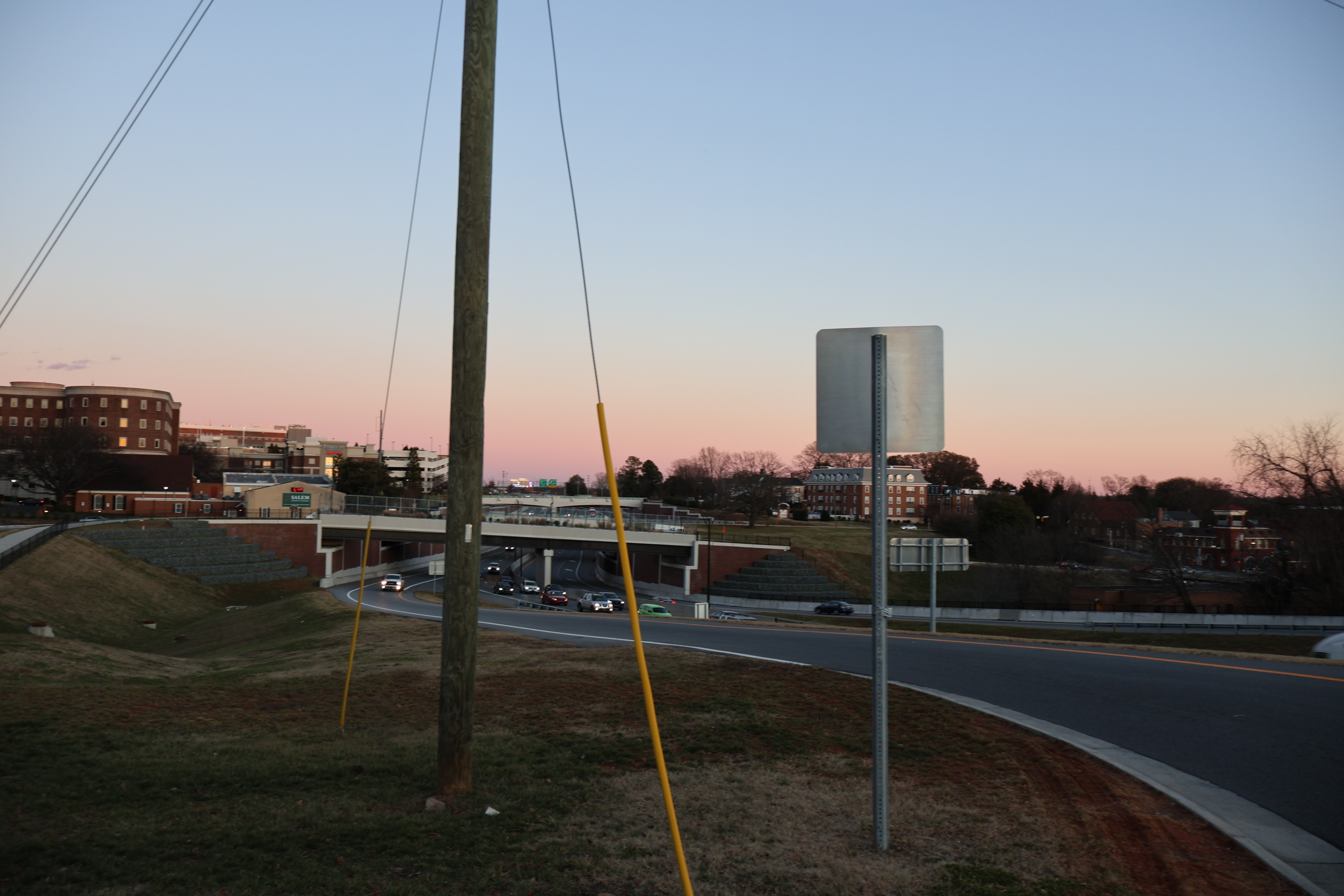
Salem Parkway (US 421/158 and NC 150) inside Downtown Winston-Salem

I-40 traverses east–west inside the city, connecting the area, east into Greensboro and west into Statesville. I-74 and I-40 interchanges with each other with a stack/cloverleaf junction, in which I-74 traverses the eastern outskirts of Winston-Salem, and connects the city to High Point. The Winston-Salem Northern Beltway is currently designated to loop around the city, mostly to the north. The Auxiliary Route I-274 will be routed onto the western stretch, while I-74 is routed onto the eastern stretch. I-285 is partially concurrent with US 52 and NC 8, spanning from I-40 to I-85; and in the future, will be extended further north onto US 52 and NC 8 inside the eastern outskirts of downtown before merging with I-74 in the northern outskirts of the city. US 421 connects to I-40 with Wilkesboro and Boone, North Carolina, in which US 421 is also proposed to be designated as I-777.

Salem Parkway (which carries both US 421 and US 158), serves the center Downtown Winston-Salem, connecting with I-40 in the west, and I-74 in the east. I-74 also connects westbound I-40 to Downtown Winston-Salem, via Exit 198 on I-40 and Exit 53 on I-74. Silas Creek Parkway carries NC 67 for most of the route, and is a regional expressway spur from the northwestern section of the city to the south central section. The corridor bypasses several areas surrounding downtown and serves as a vital connector to Wake Forest University, Hanes Mall, The LJVM Coliseum, and Forsyth Tech. Peters Creek Parkway (which carries NC 150), begins near the Davidson County line as an expressway-boulevard hybrid, entering into Downtown Winston-Salem, where NC 150 merges and traverse concurrent with US 421/158 along Salem Parkway. NC 192 is divided into two segments, in which the junction with Ridgewood Road divides the route. Ridgewood Road connects with I-74 eastward and I-40 westward.

Peters Creek Parkway, Reynolda Road (which also carries NC 67), Stratford Road (which also carries US 158), Patterson Avenue, Martin Luther King Jr. Drive, New Walkertown Road, Liberty Street, Patterson Avenue, University Parkway, Country Club Road, along others, are arterial thoroughfares which connects Downtown Winston-Salem to the outskirts of the city and surrounding areas. Other major artery routes include, Hanes Mall Boulevard, Martin Luther King Jr. Drive, Indiana Avenue, the segment of North Point Boulevard between Indiana Avenue to University Parkway, Jonestown Road, and Trade Street.

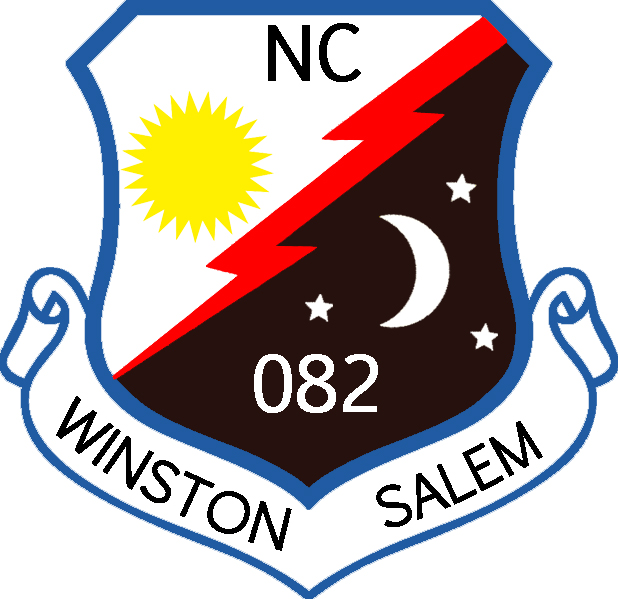
Winston-Salem Civil Air Patrol Composite Squadron patch

=== Aviation ===
Winston-Salem is served by Piedmont Triad International Airport in Greensboro. The airport also serves much of the surrounding Piedmont Triad area, including High Point, 16 miles (26 km) east; the authority that manages the airport is governed by board members appointed by all three cities as well as both of their counties, Guilford and Forsyth.

A smaller airport, known as Smith Reynolds Airport, is located within the city limits, just northeast of downtown. It is mainly used for general aviation and charter flights. Every year, Smith Reynolds Airport hosts an air show for the general public. The Smith Reynolds Airport is home to the Winston-Salem Civil Air Patrol Composite Squadron, also known as NC-082. The Civil Air Patrol is a non-profit volunteer organization.

=== Rail ===
Winston-Salem is one of the larger cities in the South that are not directly served by Amtrak. However, an Amtrak Thruway operates three times daily in each direction between Winston-Salem and the Amtrak station in nearby High Point. Buses depart from the Winston-Salem Transportation Center, then stop on the Winston-Salem State University campus before traveling to High Point. From the High Point station, riders can board the Crescent, Carolinian or Piedmont line. These lines run directly to local North Carolina destinations as well as cities across the Southeast, as far west as New Orleans and as far north as New York City.

== Sister cities ==
Winston-Salem's sister cities are:

- Buchanan, Liberia
- (The Bahamas) Freeport, Bahamas
- Kumasi, Ghana
- (The Bahamas) Nassau, Bahamas
- Ungheni, Moldova
- Yangpu (Shanghai), China

== See also ==
- List of municipalities in North Carolina
- List of tallest buildings in Winston-Salem
- May 1989 tornado outbreak
