= Winston-Salem Police Department =

City police department in North Carolina, United States

- Abbreviation: WSPD

Agency overview
- Formed: 1913
- Preceding agencies: Salem Police Department; Winston Police Department
- Employees: 732 (559 Officers, 173 civilian) (2017)
- Annual budget: $80.3 million (2022)

Jurisdictional structure
- Operations jurisdiction: Winston-Salem, North Carolina, United States
- Governing body: Winston-Salem City Council
- General nature: Local civilian police

Operational structure
- Headquarters: 725 North Cherry Street Winston-Salem, North Carolina 27101
- Sworn members: 559 (2017)
- Unsworn members: 173 (2017)
- Agency executive: Catrina A. Thompson, Chief of police
- Units: List: Patrol; Special Operations; Criminal Investigations; Forensic Services; Special Investigations; Downtown Bike Patrol; Professional Standards; Communications; Operations Supports
- Commands: List: District 1; District 2; District 3

Facilities
- Districts: 3

The Winston-Salem Police Department (WSPD) is the primary law enforcement agency serving Winston-Salem, North Carolina. As of 2017, the department employed 559 sworn officers and 173 civilian employees. WSPD serves the fifth-most populous city in North Carolina and operates across the city's approximately 133.8 square miles (347 km²), which are divided into three patrol districts.

The department is led by the Chief of Police, who is assisted by four assistant chiefs. The chief reports to the Winston-Salem assistant city manager and the Winston-Salem City Council. Since January 2023, the department has been headed by Chief William H. Penn, Jr.

== History ==
WSPD was formed in 1913 following the merger of the cities of Winston and Salem. As part of the consolidation, the Winston Police Department and Salem Police Department were also unified into a single municipal law enforcement agency.

In 1967, racial unrest erupted in Winston-Salem after a black man was struck and killed by a white police officer. Rioting began following the man's funeral on November 2 and continued into the following day. The Winston-Salem Police Department and the North Carolina National Guard responded to the disturbances. At the time, The New York Times described the unrest as "the worst outbreak of racial violence in North Carolina in this century."

In October 2018, a Winston-Salem police officer assigned as a school resource officer at Hanes Magnet School was accused of using excessive force against a female student during an on-campus incident. Body camera footage of the encounter was released by court order the following month in accordance with North Carolina law governing law enforcement recordings. The footage showed the officer repeatedly instructing the student to stop and speak with him before physical force was used. An independent review later concluded that the officer had not violated department policy and commended his de-escalation efforts.

During the nationwide protests following the murder of George Floyd in 2020, demonstrations in Winston-Salem remained largely peaceful. Police Chief Catrina Thompson addressed demonstrators in civilian clothing and publicly expressed support for peaceful protest efforts. Community organizers, local businesses, and law enforcement officials coordinated during the demonstrations, and the city's response received attention from state and local leaders.
