= WBFJ (AM) =

WBFJ-AM
- Winston-Salem, North Carolina; United States
- Broadcast area: Piedmont Triad
- Frequency: 1550 kHz

Programming
- Format: Christian radio
- Affiliations: USA Radio

Ownership
- Owner: Triad Family Network, Inc.
- Sister stations: WBFJ-FM

History
- Former call signs: WPEG; WFCM; WPGD
- Call sign meaning: "We Broadcast For Jesus"

Technical information
- Licensing authority: FCC
- Facility ID: 73708
- Class: D
- Power: 1,000 watts (days only)
- Transmitter coordinates: 36°06′33″N 80°14′44″W
- Translator: 103.5 W278AM (Sedalia)

Links
- Public license information: Public file; LMS
- Webcast: Listen live
- Website: zktdad.wixsite.com/stereo1550

WBFJ (1550 AM) is a radio station broadcasting a Christian format. Licensed to Winston-Salem, North Carolina, United States, it serves the Piedmont Triad area and is currently owned by Triad Family Network, Inc.

== History ==
The station began broadcasting in 1960 from a transmitter and studios on Northwest Blvd. in Winston-Salem with the call letters WPEG (based on the name of then-owner Nick Reisenweaver's wife, Peggy). The theme song was "Peg O' My Heart". The station broadcast a popular music and light classical format, mostly instrumental with "lush strings and a lot of show tunes". WPEG became the area's first country music station in 1963, also playing gospel music. A plan to move to 1560 AM and increase to 10,000 watts was never carried out. In October 1966, Suburban Radio Group of Belmont, North Carolina, bought WPEG and changed its call letters to WFCM. After its 1971 sale to Rev. Robert A. Mayer, Pastor D.W. Long of Thomasville, North Carolina, became manager and WFCM switched to Southern Gospel and preaching.

The station was previously owned by Forsyth Broadcasting and Quality Media.

In 1979, after its sale to Word of Life Broadcasting, Inc., the station changed its callsign to WBFJ, moved its studios to Trenwest Drive in Winston-Salem, and began playing a mix of Contemporary Christian music (CCM) and evangelical Christian and Charismatic teaching & talk. In the early 1990s, WBFJ moved its studios to the current location on North Trade Street in Winston-Salem and began broadcasting in AM stereo, while retaining the same format. In September 1994, sister station WBFJ-FM, 89.3 Winston-Salem, signed on the air with a mostly-music CCM format; the AM station expanded its Christian teaching-and-talk lineup, dropping most of its music blocks but retaining its stereo signal. WBFJ 1550 reverted to AM mono broadcasting in March 2010.

Around 2016, WBFJ aired Dave Ramsey's financial advice show, but the show is no longer heard on the station.

Effective November 23, 2016, Word of Life Broadcasting was dissolved and WBFJ was acquired by Triad Family Network, Inc., which also owns WBFJ-FM.
