= WBFJ-FM =

- Winston-Salem, North Carolina; United States
- Broadcast area: Piedmont Triad
- Frequency: 89.3 MHz
- Branding: Your Family Station

Programming
- Language: English
- Format: Contemporary Christian

Ownership
- Owner: Triad Family Network; (Triad Family Network)
- Sister stations: WBFJ

History
- First air date: September 1, 1994

Technical information
- Licensing authority: FCC
- Facility ID: 67827
- Class: A
- ERP: 2,500 watts
- HAAT: 129 meters (423 ft)
- Transmitter coordinates: 36°05′56″N 80°14′59″W
- Translator: See § Translators
- Repeater: 1510 WEAL (Greensboro)

Links
- Public license information: Public file; LMS
- Webcast: Listen live
- Website: wbfj.fm

WBFJ-FM (89.3 FM) is a radio station licensed to Winston-Salem, North Carolina, broadcasting a Contemporary Christian music format. It signed on September 1, 1994.

== Translators ==
Broadcast translators for WBFJ-FM
Call sign	Frequency	City of license	FID	ERP (W)	HAAT	Class	FCC info
W267AG	101.3 FM	Salisbury, North Carolina	67830	38	58 m (190 ft)	D	LMS
W274BO	102.7 FM	Greensboro, North Carolina	142601	10	136.6 m (448 ft)	D	LMS
W267AN	101.3 FM	Wilkesboro, North Carolina	87078	10	399.3 m (1,310 ft)	D	LMS
W274AL	102.7 FM	High Point, North Carolina	87044	10	168.7 m (553 ft)	D	LMS
W276BA	103.1 FM	Fancy Gap, Virginia	87029	10	313.9 m (1,030 ft)	D	LMS
W285DJ	104.9 FM	Mount Airy, North Carolina	67829	10	381 m (1,250 ft)	D	LMS
