= Funpals =

Undergarments for male children

- Product type: Children's underwear
- Current owner: Fruit of the Loom
- Country: USA
- Introduced: April 2, 1985
- Related brands: FunGals
- Markets: Worldwide
- Tagline: WOW! I've got the neatest pals behind me! (1980s)
- Website: Official website

Funpals is a children's underwear name brand that was established in 1985 in order to compete with Underoos. Its trademark was renewed on March 17, 2005, by William R. Hansen, trademark correspondent.

Funpals were advertised on television and in Working Mother, a magazine intended for mothers who had to balance the pressures of the workforce with motherhood.

== Summary ==
Instead of merely having the cartoon or movie's logo, Funpals uses the characters from the movie or television show on the underpants, for example Jurassic Park, Bob the Builder, Mighty Morphin Power Rangers, Spider-Man, Batman, Pokémon, Superman, Batman Begins (based on the 2005 American motion picture) and Angry Birds.

To trim costs and improve profitability, all Funpals undergarments intended for sale in the Americas are manufactured in Latin American countries. Other places that manufacture Funpals briefs include Canada, Europe and North Africa.

Funpals are made only in the traditional briefs format although modern boxer briefs for children have been inspired by the more recent Underoos designs. Sizing for Funpals start at a "boys' small" (size 4) and ends at a "boys' large" or "boys' extra large". Occasionally, some designs reach the maximum size at a "boys' triple-extra large" (equivalent to a men's medium or a size 32). With their juvenile design, these are designed for obese boys rather than adolescent males and adult men. A petition to expand the Funpals line into sizes worn by adult males (and into designs based on adult male-oriented licensed properties), was unsuccessful.

The female equivalent of Funpals are called FunGals. They have designs like Dragon Tales, Bob the Builder (using the female characters) and Pokémon while carrying the traditional design of adult female panties. Fruit of the Loom manufactures Funpals underwear while Hanes manufactures Showtoons which directly competes with both Funpals and FunGals. Unlike Showtoons, Funpals shows its design with a giant print on the center of the undergarment.

According to leading parenting manuals, Funpals and similar childish underwear are generally considered to be a bad idea for any child over the age of eight, owing to the added fun that a schoolyard bully acquires by giving a wedgie to a weaker boy who wears briefs with cartoons on them, which almost inevitably leads to a chronic bullying problem.
