= Bali (lingerie) =

American lingerie company

- Company type: Subsidiary
- Industry: apparel
- Founded: 1927
- Headquarters: Winston-Salem, North Carolina, United States
- Key people: Sara Stein
- Products: bras, panties, sleepwear, hosiery
- Parent: HanesBrands Inc.
- Website: BaliBras.com

Bali is a lingerie company operating in the United States of America.

== Overview ==
Bali began in 1927 with Sara Stein as Fay-Miss. In 1935 the company changed its name to Bali Brassiere Company. Bali merged with Hanes Corporation in 1969. Hanes was then sold to Chicago-based Consolidated Foods Company, which became Sara Lee Corporation in 1985.

In 2006 Sara Lee spun off its apparel company into HanesBrands Inc. HanesBrands owns many other clothing brands, including: Hanes (its largest brand), Champion (its second largest brand), Playtex (its third largest brand), Maidenform, Just My Size, Barely There, Wonderbra, L’eggs, C9 by Champion, Duofold, Beefy-T, Outer Banks, Sol y Oro, Rinbros, Zorba and Ritmo. Bali launched the "Live Beautifully" campaign in 2007 that featured notable photographer and director Peter Lindbergh. This campaign was created by KraftWorks NYC, their primary advertising agency since 2005.
