= Playtex =

American feminine hygiene and baby care brand

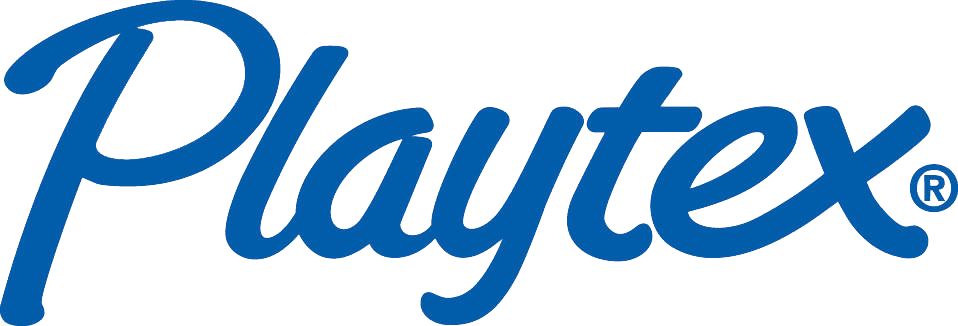
- Playtex Products logo (top), Playtex Intimates logo (bottom)
- Product type: Tampon, gloves, baby bottle, feminine bras/lingerie, space suits
- Current owner: Hanesbrands; Edgewell Personal Care
- Country: United States
- Introduced: 1947; 79 years ago
- Previous owners: International Latex Corp.; Playtex Products Inc.
- Registered as a trademark in: United States, Canada
- Tagline: Making Every Day Better (feminine and infant care); Who Knows You Like We Do? (bras)
- Website: PlaytexTampons.com; PlaytexBras.com

Playtex is an American brand name covering apparel and feminine care products, most notably bras and tampons. It was founded in 1947 as a division of the International Latex Corporation (ILC), originally to produce consumer latex goods. Playtex was the first to advertise undergarments on national television in 1955, and the first to show a live model wearing only a bra in a commercial, in 1977. ILC's industrial division developed space suits for the Apollo program, before being spun off as ILC Dover in 1967.

Playtex introduced tampons in the 1960s, becoming the primary competition to incumbent Tampax. Playtex patented the plastic tampon applicator in 1973. It was among the tampon manufacturers sued in the 1980s following evidence linking high-absorbency tampons to toxic shock syndrome.

The brand's ownership has changed many times since its founding. Following acquisitions by Esmark, Beatrice Foods, and a management buyout in 1986, Playtex split in 1988 into separate apparel and consumer products companies. The apparel business is owned by Hanesbrands, while the consumer products brands were acquired by Energizer Holdings and later spun off into Edgewell Personal Care in 2015. Between 2017 and 2026, Edgewell sold the gloves, infant care and feminine care businesses separately. Global feminine care rights are now owned by Swedish company Essity.

== History ==
=== Early history ===
Abram Nathaniel Spanel founded the International Latex Corporation in Rochester, New York, in 1932 to produce latex products such as bathing caps, swimwear, and baby pants. ILC moved to Dover, Delaware, in 1939, making it the first large, non-agricultural business in the city.

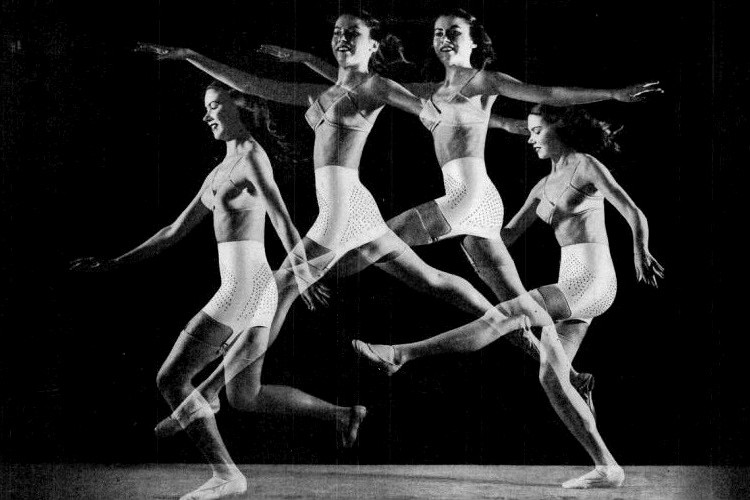
A woman leaping while wearing a 1940s latex girdle

ILC did not produce apparel for adults until the introduction of the Living Girdle in 1940, after patenting a method of manufacturing latex girdles that would not tear at the seams if they had a small tear or hole. The Living Girdle was advertised with images of mobility and comfort, such as women playing tennis or leaping while wearing it, though the solid rubber girdle was actually very uncomfortable.

During World War II, the bombing of Pearl Harbor and the Japanese invasion of Malaysia cut off Allied manufacturers from their largest sources of latex. Supplies ran out and demand fell for consumer products, so ILC halted production; sales did not resume until 1946. The company almost went out of business during the war, so it created an industrial division to find government and military applications for latex. Playtex was founded in 1947 as one of four divisions into which ILC re-organized. Its name was a portmanteau of "play" and "latex", reflecting its focus on latex products. Playtex's marketing in the post-war era was influential in creating the shift from custom-tailored undergarments to manufactured sizes. For example, the company introduced large floor displays with fitting charts so that women could find the right size without a custom fitting.

In 1954, ILC was sold to Stanley Warner Corporation for $15 million($180 million in modern dollars). The following year, it was the first to advertise undergarments on network television. In 1962, the industrial division of Playtex was awarded a contract to develop space suits for the Apollo mission to the Moon, including a customized suit for Neil Armstrong. Playtex's industrial division was spun off in 1967, two years before the Moon landing that utilized its space suits; it eventually became ILC Dover.

Playtex created the consumer products subsidiary Playtex Products Inc. in 1960 which produced baby products, tampons, and other consumer goods. It introduced and patented the first plastic tampon applicator in 1973. By 1975, the five largest tampon manufacturers began competing with multimillion-dollar advertising budgets, and Playtex became the primary competitor to market-leader Tampax. Playtex introduced a scented tampon that was advertised with the slogan, "When you're wearing a tampon you don't worry about odor. But should you?" Planned Parenthood complained, so a warning label was added saying that some women may experience irritation from the chemicals. Playtex and other tampon manufacturers were sued for aggressively advertising and competing over absorbency, when some studies found that excessive absorbency leads to toxic shock syndrome. In 1985, a judge offered to reduce an $11 million verdict against Playtex if they would recall their super-plus tampons and admit that they were killing women.

=== Joel Smilow era ===
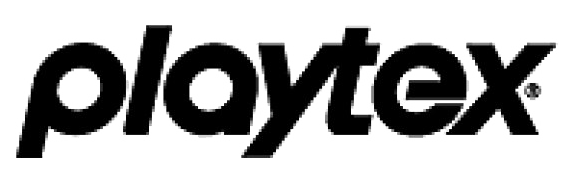
The Playtex logo before the brand was split among multiple companies

Joel Smilow became chief executive officer (CEO) of Playtex in 1969 and was associated with the company through five owners. The company was acquired by Esmark in 1975 for $210 million ($1.26 billion in modern dollars).

By the early 1980s, Playtex controlled 25 percent of the market for bras, giving it the largest market-share in the industry. In 1982, Playtex acquired the skin and hair products brand, Jhirmack Enterprises Inc., for $28.3 million ($94.4 million in 2018 dollars). Three years later Esmark sold Playtex to Beatrice Foods. Four years later an investor group led by Smilow bought Playtex for $1.25 billion ($3.67 billion in modern dollars). To help fund the acquisition, the company's cosmetics brands, Max Factor, Almay and Halston, were sold to Revlon for $345 million ($939 million in modern dollars).

The semi-nude model in a 1985 advertisement that took advantage of relaxed NAB regulations

The following year, the National Association of Broadcasters (NAB) relaxed rules regarding partial nudity on television, which previously forced undergarment manufacturers to use mannequins in their commercials, despite bathing suits and equally revealing swimwear being allowed. Playtex was the first to advertise with a live model wearing only a bra from the waist up. This attracted criticisms from members of the American Family Association and the Eagle Forum. The New York Times called the ads "totally inoffensive" and CBS's spokesman said they were "well done, tasteful and not exploitative".

Ownership of the remaining apparel and consumer products divisions were split among the company's leadership (28 percent), BCI Holdings (20 percent), Drexel Burnham (19 percent) and institutional investors (33 percent). The following year the company attempted to sell the Family Products division to Johnson and Johnson but the deal fell through.

In 1988, Playtex split into two companies, Playtex Apparel and Playtex Family Products, in a series of financial transactions totaling $1.3 billion. The transactions allowed Smilow to buy out other Playtex shareholders and put ownership of the brand into two separate investment groups that were owned by Smilow and other Playtex executives. In 1990 Playtex Products acquired cosmetics brand Maybelline for $300 million ($739 million in modern dollars). The next year Smilow sold Playtex Apparel to the Sara Lee Corporation, owner of the Bali and Hanes brands, for $571 million, ($1.35 billion in modern dollars) but keeping the Playtex Family Products Corporation.

In November that year, Sara Lee also bought a 25 percent stake in Playtex Family Products for $62.5 million ($148 million in modern dollars). Playtex Products Inc. went public in 1994. In 1995, another 40 percent of Playtex Products Inc. was sold to Haas Wheat & Harrison Investment Partners for $180 million ($380 million in modern dollars).

=== Recent history ===
Playtex Products continued to erode Tampax's market share throughout the late 20th century. The two companies had divided the market almost evenly by the late 1990s. Both makers increased profits primarily by reducing the tampon count per box, and prepared to enter emerging markets, particularly in Asia, where many women still used homemade pads. In 1997 Procter & Gamble (P&G), makers of Always sanitary napkins and pantiliners, bought Tambrands for $1.25 billion, its largest acquisition up to that point, returning to the tampon sector almost two decades after pulling Rely from the market over Toxic Shock Syndrome concerns.

Due to its strong advantage among younger women, and baby boomers reaching menopause, Playtex continued to gain market share on Tampax. After extensive market research, Tampax reversed that trend with the 2002 introduction of Pearl, with an applicator designed to be as visually appealing as it was functional, and making the brand once again appealing to teens.

Playtex responded by litigating. In one suit, it alleged patent infringement over Pearl's applicator design. It also alleged that advertising claiming Tampax Pearl had better leakage protection and comfort than Gentle Glide was false. Playtex won a verdict prohibiting Tampax from making claims of superiority, until the decision was reversed in 2007, when Tampax made improvements in materials and manufacturing.

In 2006, Sara Lee spun off its clothing sector into HanesBrands Inc., which now runs the Playtex apparel business. The next year Playtex Products acquired the Hawaiian Tropic sunscreen company for $83 million. Later that year Playtex Products was acquired by Energizer Holdings for $1.16 billion. Following Canada's 2008 ban on polycarbonate baby bottles containing bisphenol A, Playtex announced it would offer BPA-free replacements. In 2009, Playtex was among six major bottle manufacturers that agreed to remove BPA from their products following a request from state attorneys general.

In 2013, the Playtex intimate apparel brand launched a $10 million integrated marketing campaign called "Be Uniquely You". This 360 rebranding included new bra styles and packaging and a strong presence in social media and national TV ads. The new campaign was created by KraftWorks NYC.

In 2015, Energizer Holdings spun out several businesses including Playtex Products into a new company called Edgewell Personal Care. In October 2017, Playtex Gloves was sold to Freudenberg Household Products LP for $19 million. In December 2019, Edgewell sold its infant and pet care business to Montreal-based Le Holdings Angelcare Inc. for $122.5 million.

In November 2025, Edgewell sold Playtex, Carefree, Stayfree, and o.b. brands to Essity for $340 million, closing the transition by February 2026. In December 2025, Hanesbrands was acquired by Montreal-based Gildan Activewear for approximately $4.4 billion of enterprise value.

== Organization ==
The Playtex trademark is owned by Playtex Marketing Corp. in the United States and Canada, which licenses it to separate companies for each of its five product categories. HBI Branded Apparel Enterprise, a subsidiary of Hanesbrands, holds the license for Playtex-branded apparel in the US and Canada, as well as international rights in most markets. Global feminine care rights were acquired by Essity from Edgewell Personal Care in February 2026. Le Holdings Anglecare Inc. holds exclusive license for infant and pet care products in the US, Canada, and internationally following its acquisition from Edgewell in 2019. Freudenberg Household Products LP acquired the rights to household gloves from Edgewell in 2017.

== Products ==
The best-selling Playtex tampon is the Gentle Glide brand, first introduced in 1973. It also manufactures the Playtex Sport tampon, which targets young athletes. Both brands are sold in regular, super and super-plus absorbency. As of 2000, Playtex had a 30 percent share of a $780 million market for tampons in the U.S.

Playtex-branded apparel products sold by Hanesbrands include bras, panties and shapewear. The company has been producing and marketing the Cross Your Heart bra since 1954 under the slogan that it "lifts and separates." The Eighteen Hour bra has been marketed on the premise of comfort since the 1970s.

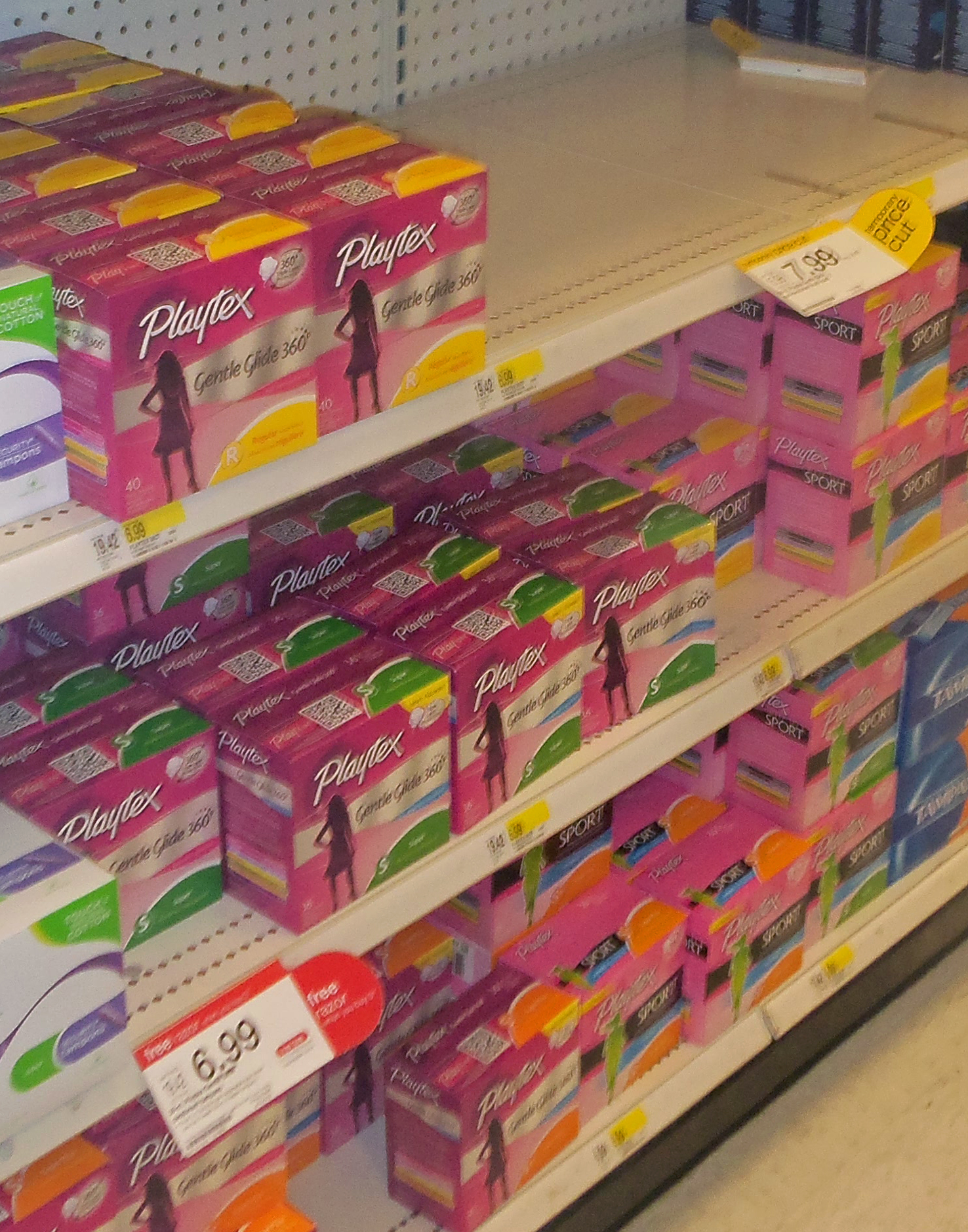
Playtex tampons for sale at a Target.

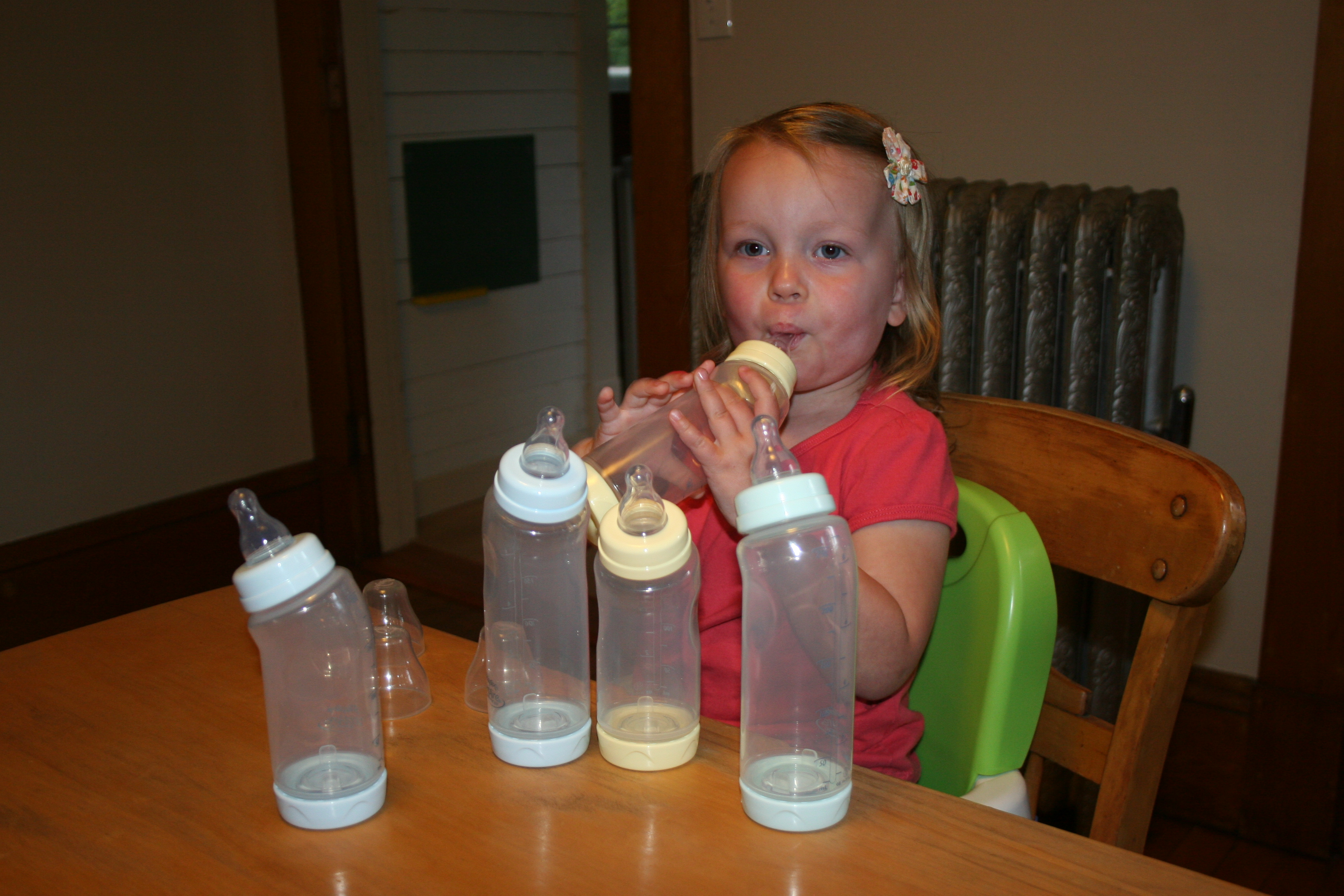
Playtex baby bottles

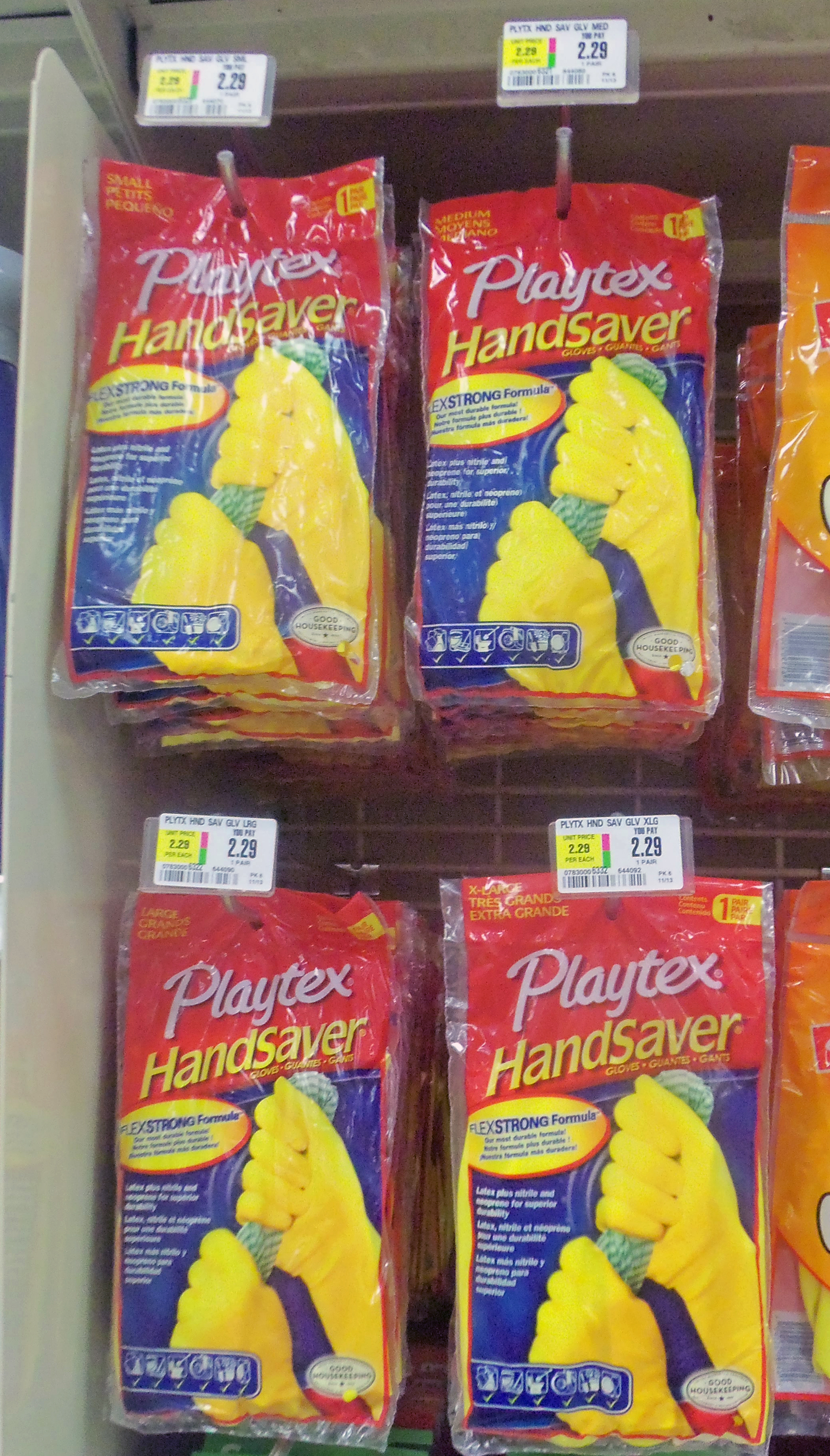
Playtex dish gloves on sale

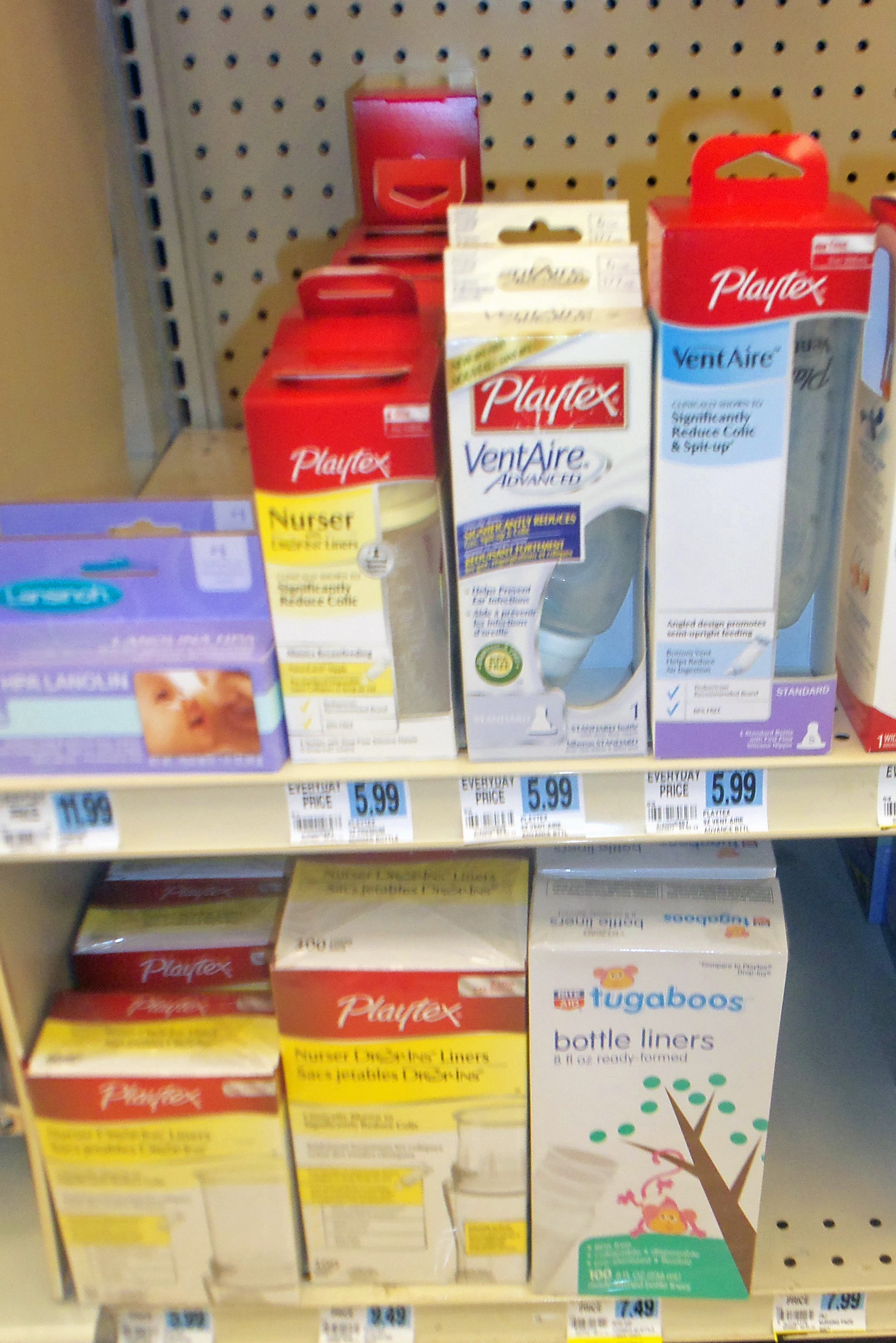
Playtex baby bottle liners on sale
