= Roger Ferriter =

American graphic designer (1932–2015)

Roger Ferriter (September 6, 1932 – August 28, 2015) was an American graphic designer. He is known as the progenitor of the L'eggs name, logo and packaging design (the L'eggs egg and egg-shaped dispenser).

== Personal life ==
Ferriter was born in Cranston, Rhode Island. He was a lieutenant in the U.S. Marine Corps and later played minor league baseball for the Boston Red Sox.

== Career ==
Ferriter worked at Herb Lubalin Associates in New York and was given an opportunity to design new packaging for Hanes' new line of pantyhose. The packaging design was in the form of an egg to promote how compact pantyhose could be and branding the line to rhyme with "legs." Although the concept was initially considered 'a marketing risk' by the board members, the risk turned into a multibillion-dollar enterprise. The design made its way to 70,000 retail outlets, the Museum of Modern Art and by 1978, accounted for 38 percent of Hanes' business. During the 1970s and 1980s the L'eggs egg became a ubiquitous part of the culture, once referred to as the 'marketing breakthrough of the 20th Century.'

He also designed numerous logos, including Sport, Argosy, and Signature magazines, conceived other brand and packaging concepts, such as the Westinghouse Turtle Lite, and was the first to design an animated logo for television, for Metromedia TV back in the mid-1960s. Ferriter was later the Art Director at Burson-Marsteller and taught graphic design at the School of Visual Arts in New York for 30 years. He emphasized lean, elegant design solutions, distilling ideas down to their essence. The work of his students can be found in his book, Typerformance.
