= John Wesley Hanes II =

American businessman and government official

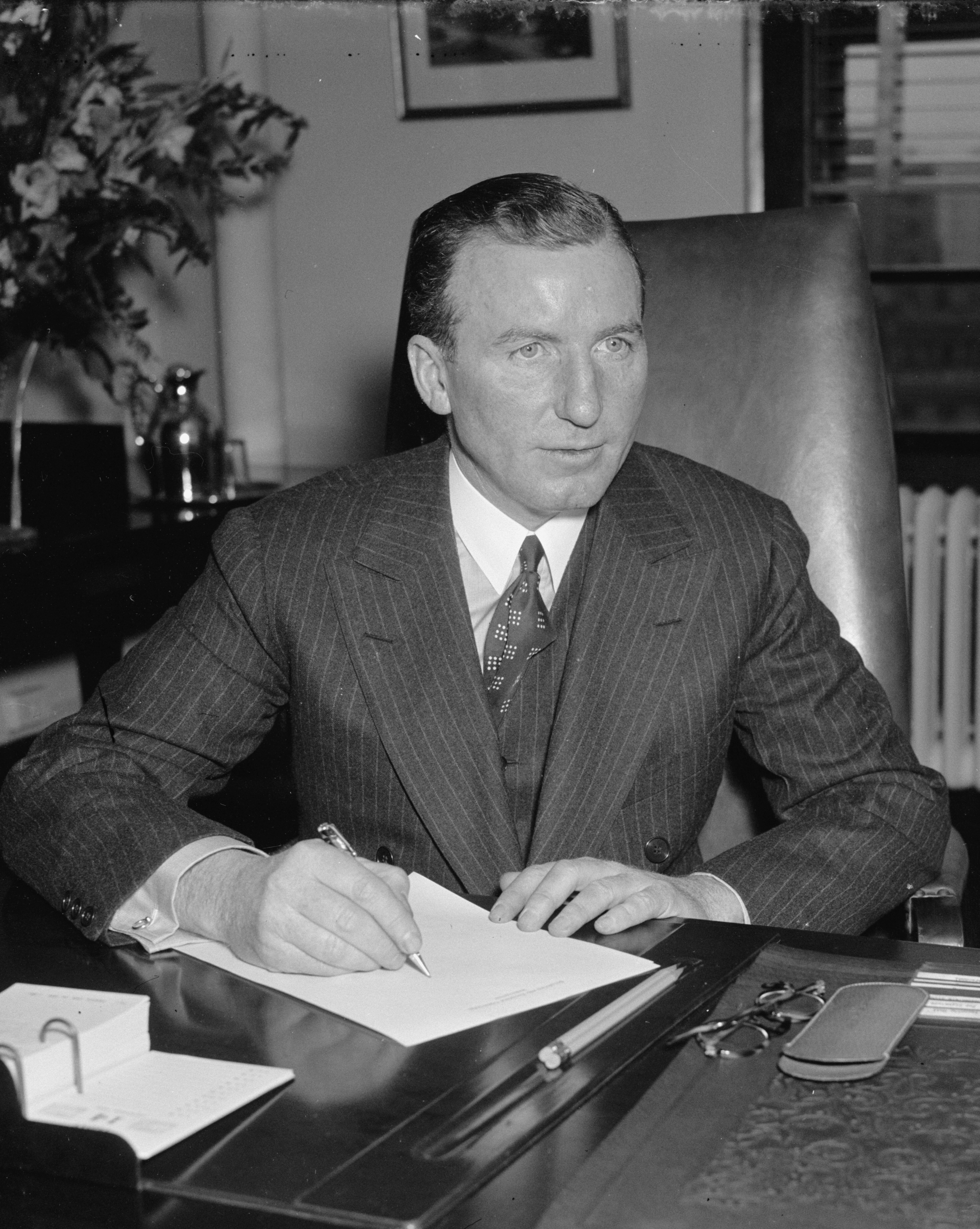
- Hanes in 1938

Under Secretary of the Treasury
- In office October 29, 1938 – December 31, 1939
- President: Franklin D. Roosevelt
- Preceded by: Roswell Magill
- Succeeded by: Daniel W. Bell

Personal details
- Born: April 24, 1892 Winston-Salem, North Carolina
- Died: December 24, 1987 (aged 95) Millbrook, New York
- Spouses: Agnes Mitchel (m. 1916; died 1935) Hope Yandell Hanes (m. 1937)
- Relations: James Gordon Hanes (brother); Robert March Hanes (brother)
- Children: 5, including John W. Hanes III
- Parent: John Wesley Hanes I
- Education: Yale University
- Occupation: Financier, thoroughbred racing executive and owner
- Known for: Under Secretary of the Treasury

John Wesley Hanes II (April 24, 1892 – December 24, 1987) was an American investment banker and corporate turnaround specialist who served as Under Secretary of the United States Treasury and was President of the New York Racing Association and a Thoroughbred racehorse owner and breeder named an Exemplar of Racing.

== Family, education, military service ==
Born in Winston-Salem, North Carolina, John Hanes II was the son of John Wesley Hanes and Anna Jannette Hodgin Hanes. His father was the founder of Shamrock Mills who was also a significant shareholder of Reynolds Tobacco Company through the sale of a tobacco business he had started.

John Hanes II was educated at the Woodberry Forest School in Madison County, Virginia and went on to graduate from Yale University in 1915. Financial management proved to be Hanes II's forte as it was for his elder brother, Robert March Hanes (1890–1959), a career banker who rose from the teller's job in 1919 at Wachovia Bank & Trust Co. to become its President in 1931, a position he held until his retirement in 1956.

John Hanes II married Agnes Mitchel in 1916 with whom he had three children. She died at their home in Rye, New York on September 19, 1935, In 1937 he married Hope Yandell, former wife of William Arnold Hanger, with whom he had a son and a daughter.

== Private and Government career in finance ==
John Hanes II served with the United States Navy during World War I. When the war ended, he went to New York City where found employment as a bond salesman with the Wall Street stock brokerage firm, Charles D. Barney and Company. He quickly demonstrated his skills and was made a general partner in the firm and by 1935 had been elevated to senior partner. Hanes became a governor of the New York Stock Exchange and his high-profile resulted in President Roosevelt appointing him to the Federal Securities and Exchange Commission in 1937. In May 1938, President Roosevelt appointed John Hanes II as an Assistant Secretary of the Treasury and in October to Under Secretary of the Treasury to succeed Roswell Magill. His main focus was a Revenue Revision Study that he had completed when he handed in his resignation effective December 31, 1939 when he resigned to return to private enterprise. In the 1940 presidential election, Hanes broke with the Roosevelt Administration and supported Wendell Willkie in his unsuccessful campaign for president.

=== Financial restructuring expertise ===
In June 1940, John Hanes II was hired by the financially troubled United States Lines and its parent company, the International Mercantile Marine Company. Hanes was made a member of the company's Board of Directors and named chairman of the executive committee for both entities. Such was his reputation that a month later, John Hanes II was also hired by the Hearst Corporation to restructure that debt-ridden company's finances. He was made a member of the company's Board of Directors which appointed him Chairman of the Finance Committee.

John Hanes II was a long-time friend of fellow horse racing enthusiast, John M. Olin, President and Chairman of Olin Corporation. He was hired by Olin in 1949 to undertake a restructuring of the company. It turned into a ten-year job and for thirty-two years Hanes served on the Olin Corporation's Board of Directors.

== Thoroughbred horse racing ==
=== Owner and breeder ===
It was Hope Hanes who introduced her husband to the sport of Thoroughbred horse racing. Together they raced horses in the United States, England, and Ireland. John and Hope Hanes were part of the syndicate that purchased top stars for breeding such as My Babu, Nashua, and Royal Charger. Among their other notable horses, they purchased Bold Bidder in partnership with John R. Gaines and John M. Olin.

=== Racing industry executive ===
John Hanes II served as President of the National Museum of Racing and Hall of Fame from 1968 to 1970. In 1982 he was named an Exemplar of Racing, an honor bestowed on only four other people.

In 1953, John Hanes II was elected a steward of the New York Racing Association and served as it unpaid President from 1954 to 1960 when he was named Chairman. During his tenure he oversaw the construction of the new Aqueduct Race Track that opened on September 14, 1959. In 1960, he was honored by the New York Turf Writers Association as "the man who did the most for racing." Hanes resigned from the NYRA executive at the end of 1961 following treatment for a heart problem at Lawrence & Memorial Hospital in New London, Connecticut.

=== Hall of Fame recognition ===
In 2023 Hanes will be posthumously inducted into the National Museum of Racing and Hall of Fame as a Pillar of the Turf for his contributions to thoroughbred racing.
