= Briefs =

Type of form-fitting underpants and swimwear

A man wearing a pair of flyless low-rise briefs shown from different angles

Briefs (or a brief) are a type of short, form-fitting underwear and swimwear, as opposed to styles where material extends down the thighs. Briefs have various different styles, usually with a waistband attached to fabric that runs along the pelvis to the crotch and buttocks, and are worn by both men and women. Swim briefs are a variation used as swimwear.

== History ==
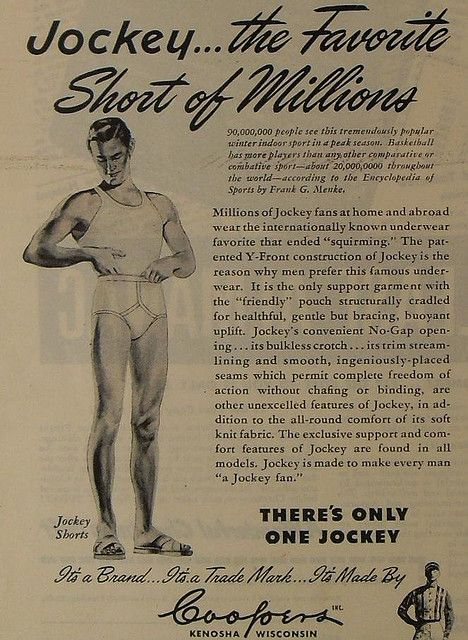
Advertisement for Coopers brand men’s briefs

Men's classic briefs were first sold on January 19, 1935, by Coopers, Inc. (now known as Jockey International), in Chicago, Illinois, at Marshall Field's department store. They dubbed the new undergarment the "Jockey", because it offered a similar degree of support as the jockstrap (one style of which is also called "jock briefs" or "support briefs"). The designer of the style was reportedly inspired by a postcard he had received from a friend visiting the French Riviera depicting a man in a very short, form-fitting bathing suit. Within three months of their introduction, 30,000 pairs were sold. In the United Kingdom, briefs were first sold in 1938. Shortly afterward, shops were selling 3,000 pairs of briefs per week. The men’s brief would also influence the design of women’s underpants going forward.

In the 1960s, fashion underwear was introduced in the United States, and, after a period of decline, became more prominent in the 1970s as the belief that wearing fashionable underwear was less masculine declined. By the 1980s, men's fashion briefs became more popular in the United States. In 1985, they made up 25% of the men's underwear market, while they had almost no share in 1980. The Underoos and Funpals fashion brief brands for children were introduced around that time. According to Hanes marketing director John Wigodsky, women purchased fashion briefs for their husbands for aesthetic reasons, and therefore fashion briefs became more popular with men. In 1990, Tom Zucco of the Tampa Bay Times interviewed menswear sellers: one worker stated that about 50% of the underpants sold were white briefs.

During the 1990s to early 2000s, the popularity of men's briefs declined in the U.S. and boxer shorts became widely portrayed as the casual and masculine choice. However, starting in the mid-2000s, men's fashion trended in favor of more tailored clothing, with form-fitting underwear such as briefs having a resurgence in popularity for men, including newer styles such as boxer briefs.

== Terminology ==
In the United States, "jockey shorts" or "jockeys" became an often used generic term for men's briefs. More recently, "tighty-whiteys" (and some less popular variants of it) has become a commonly used slang term for male briefs, especially traditional full-cut ones.

In the United Kingdom, the term "jockeys" is not widely used and men's/boys' briefs are often referred to as "Y-fronts". The term derives from the genericized trademark "Y-Front", property of Jockey International. It, in turn, derives from the inverted Y-shape formed by the seams at the front of the underpants. The colloquialism is used even when the fly opening may differ in style, and not actually form the shape of the inverted letter "Y" fly on Jockey brand briefs.

In Australia, male briefs are also referred to as "jocks" but should not be confused with jockstraps (more specifically used by athletes) which expose the buttocks. Australians generally use the word "briefs" to refer to the bikini-style briefs for men.

Additionally, "briefs" is the official name of a specific cut of female underpants similar to male full-rise briefs.

== Design ==
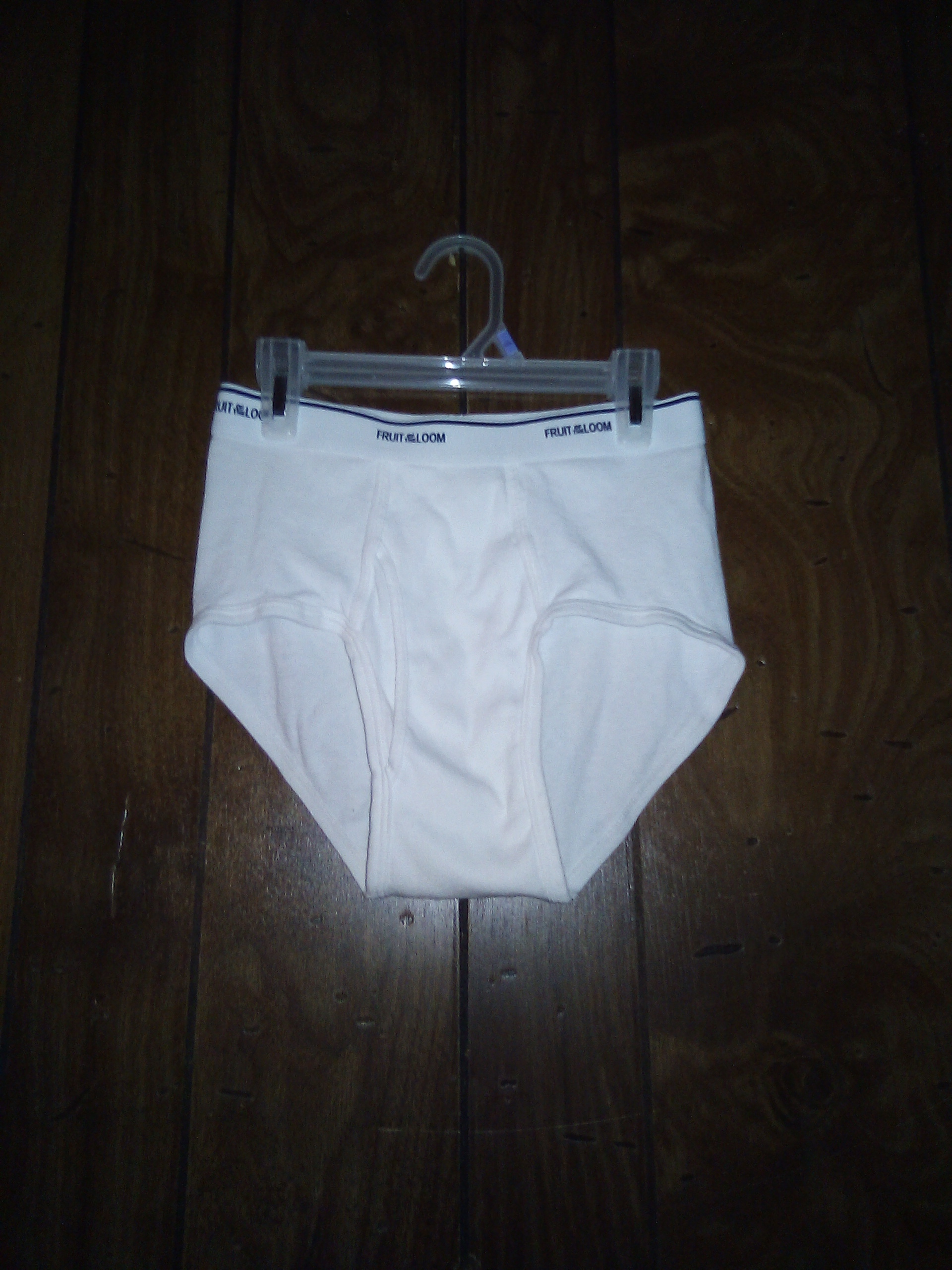
Men's full-rise briefs with vertical fly-opening

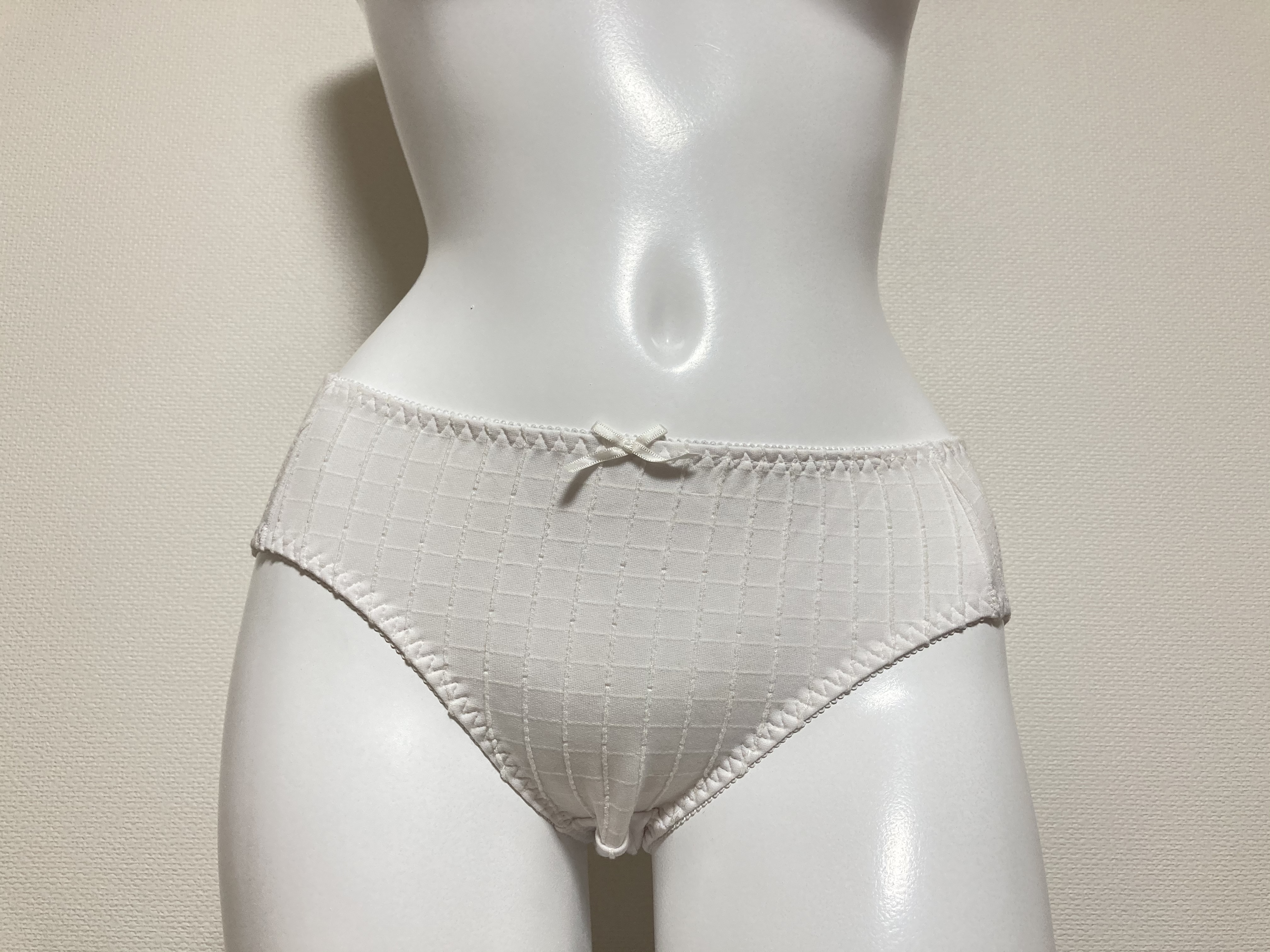
A mannequin wearing women's briefs

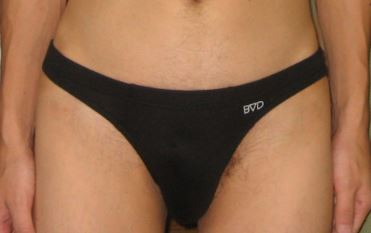
A man wearing bikini briefs

Traditional size briefs for both sexes cover the uppermost part of the thigh and extend upward up to (or cover, depending on the design) the navel at the waistband. This style is often referred to as "full rise" or "full cut". There are also "low rise" and "mid rise" styles whose measurements vary between manufacturers.

Bikini briefs or simply bikini in context are a style of brief with narrow material at the sides and which often have a low rise; reminiscent of a bikini, and are designed for either men or women.

=== Men ===
Men's briefs often have a fly, a covered opening on the front of the garment which allows for convenience in urinating. There are several different fly designs in common use, including the standard vertical fly, the horizontal fly, the Y-front fly, and others. The use of a fly is optional, and many styles do not include them; notably bikini briefs. Briefs without a fly-opening are often referred to as "slips" or "slip-briefs", a term that is also used in non-English speaking European countries.

Unlike boxer shorts, briefs hold the wearer's genitals in a relatively fixed position, which make briefs a popular underwear choice for men who are participating in athletic activities or who prefer more support than loose-fitting underpants can provide. In addition, boxer shorts and boxer briefs may ride up the body uncomfortably when the wearer is running or wearing form-fitting attire. There are different names for variations of the brief depending on the outseam of the brief, with names including low-rise, mid-rise, full-rise, sport, active, hip, and bikini. Tanga briefs are a style have the cut all the way to the waistband on the side.

=== Women ===
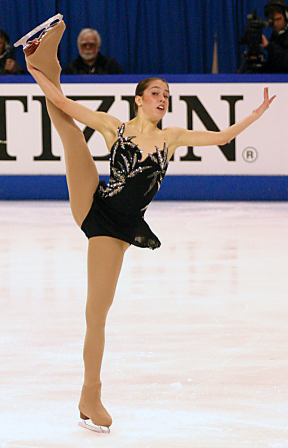
A figure skater wears a costume with attached briefs under the skirt.

"Briefs" also refers to a style of women's and girls' panties that is typically cut with a high waist to provide full coverage of the hips and buttocks. A control brief is a kind of high-waisted panty girdle. French-cut or high-cut briefs expose more of the front part of the thigh, while boy briefs have short legs, similar to men's trunk briefs, often combined with a lower waist.

Full briefs cover the woman's upper-thighs, with some styles covering up to the navel. Midi briefs are a hybrid between boyshorts and a full brief, sitting on the woman's hips while providing full-coverage. Brazilian-style women's briefs, usually made of modal-fabric, have high-cut legs and sit low across the hips. The back is wider than a thong, but often smaller than other women's brief styles, making Brazilian briefs an ideal choice for women to avoid showing a visible panty line without having to wear a thong.

Briefs is also the name given to costumed outerwear worn by female dancers and athletes in sports such as cheerleading, figure skating, and tennis. These briefs are typically worn under a short skirt; they may be attached to the skirt or dress body, or a separate garment (such as cheer briefs, or spankies).

== Possible effect on male fertility ==
Research on the effect of men wearing tight underpants, like briefs, on male fertility is inconclusive. Tight-fitting underwear (such as briefs and boxer briefs) have been blamed for negatively affecting sperm production, since they may interfere with cooling of the testicles. However, not all research have used the same conclusion. A study in the October 1998 Journal of Urology, for example, concluded that underpant type is unlikely to have a significant effect on male fertility.

== See also ==
- Bikini
- Boxer briefs
- Bra
- Panties
- Thong
- Underwear
- Underpants
