= Showtoons =

Undergarments for children

- Product type: Children's underwear
- Current owner: Hanes
- Country: United States
- Introduced: January 17, 1989
- Discontinued: August 22, 2009
- Markets: Worldwide
- Tagline: Step into Showtoons and Step into Fun!

Showtoons were a trademark of children's underwear that were manufactured by Hanes, established in 1989, and disestablished in 2009. Its competitor, Fruit of the Loom, manufactured the Funpals (for boys) and FunGals (for girls) brands.

== Summary ==
Each individual undergarment started out as a pair of either plain white briefs or plain white panties until the desired prints are added in the manufacturing process. Differences found between the male and female undergarments included the fly in the boys' underwear (for easier urination) and the feminine waistband in the girls' underwear (emulating that of women's full cut panties). The softness of the cotton fabric used could have also determined whether the undergarment was to be worn by a male child or a female child when outside of its original packaging box.

Examples of Saturday morning cartoons and movie characters that appeared on a pair of Showtoons underwear included Tinker Bell, Blue's Clues, and the PBS Kids GO! television show Arthur. Characters that were considered to be "retro" and "vintage" on Showtoons underwear (and no longer sold in most retail stores) included The Smurfs, Jonny Quest, and TaleSpin. The word "showtoons" was considered to be a pun on the phrase show tunes (which happened to be music played at Broadway musicals) and a portmanteau of the words "show business" and "cartoons". The Showtoons name by itself does not determine whether the product was suitable for boys or girls. Girls' underwear were always packaged as panties; the equivalent for juvenile males were always packaged as briefs. Unlike Funpals which had a large cartoon graphic at the center of the undergarment, Showtoons uses a small but plentiful amount of cartoon graphics throughout the undergarment.

In the Americas, Showtoons were made in either El Salvador or Honduras in manufacturing plants similar to adult underwear.

== See also ==
- FunGals, Fruit of the Loom's underwear for girls
- Funpals, Fruit of the Loom's underwear for boys
