= Hanesbrands =

American clothing company

Hanesbrands Inc.
- Type: Public
- Traded as: NYSE: HBI
- Founded: 1901; 125 years ago
- Founder: John Wesley Hanes (Shamrock Mills); Pleasant H. Hanes (P. H. Hanes Knitting Company)
- Headquarters: Winston-Salem, North Carolina, U.S.
- Number of locations: 423 outlet stores (2024)
- Key people: Stephen B. Bratspies (CEO); Scott Lewis (CFO)
- Brands: Hanes; Playtex; Bali; L'eggs; Just My Size; Barely There; Wonderbra; Maidenform; Berlei; Bonds
- Revenue: ▼US$3.51 billion (2024)
- Operating income: ▼US$186 million (2024)
- Net income: ▼US$−320 million (2024)
- Total assets: ▼US$3.84 billion (2024)
- Total equity: ▼US$34 million (2024)
- Owner: Gildan
- Number of employees: 41,000 (2024)
- Website: www.hanes.com/corporate

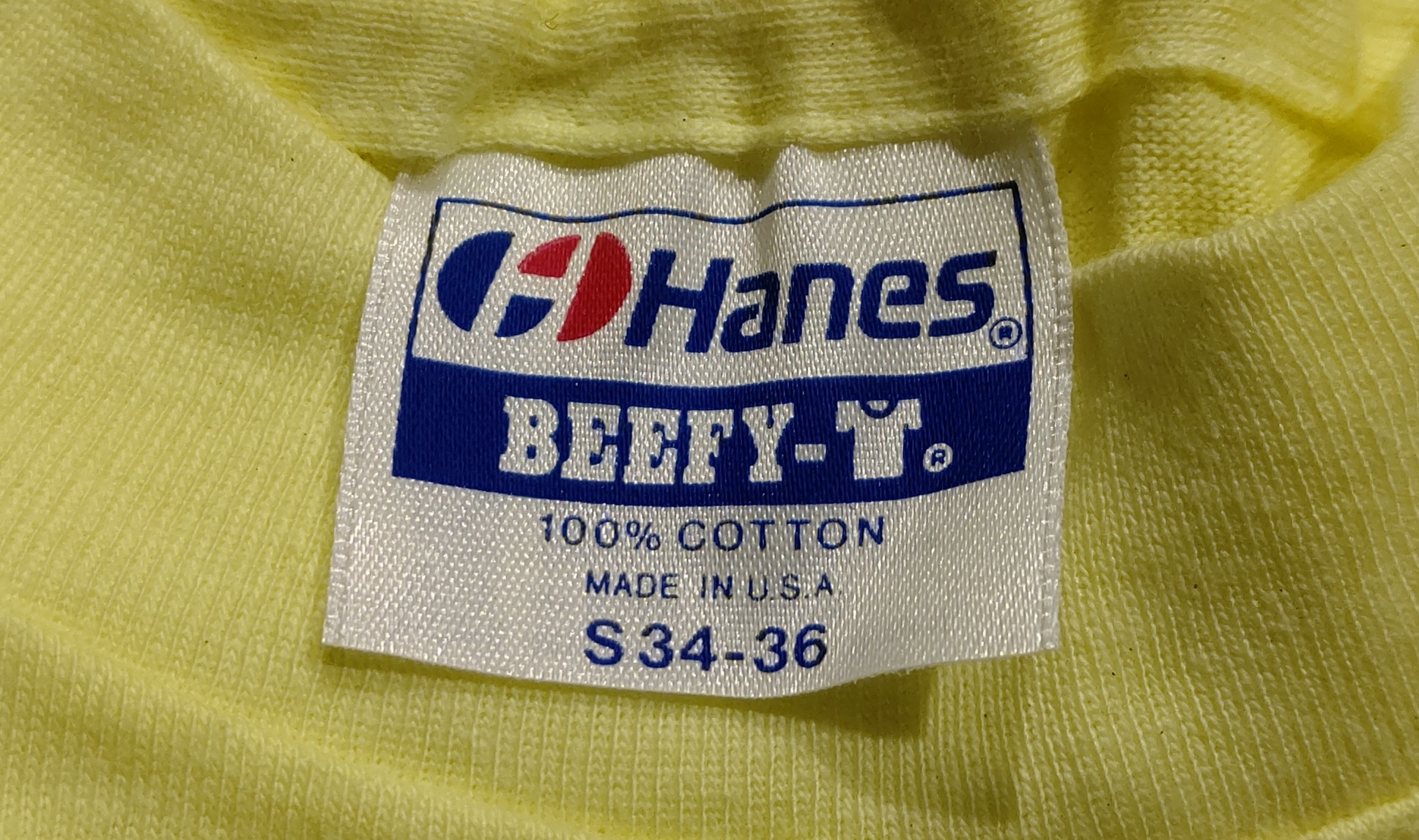
A tag on the inside of a Hanes T-shirt

Hanesbrands Inc. is an American multinational clothing company based in Winston-Salem, North Carolina. Employing 65,300 people internationally, it owns several clothing brands, including Hanes, Playtex, Bali, L'eggs, Just My Size, Barely There, Wonderbra, Maidenform, Berlei, and Bonds. The company was acquired by Gildan in 2025.

== History ==
The original Hanes outlet store was housed in a room adjacent to their factory. It currently operates and owns around 220 Hanesbrands, Maidenform and Champion retail stores across the US.

On September 6, 2006, the company and several brands were spun off by the Sara Lee Corporation. Its flagship store is located in Winston-Salem, North Carolina and opened in summer 2008.

Its stores range in size from 2,500 to 17,000 square feet Hanesbrands has companies in various parts of Europe, including the United Kingdom, Italy, Germany, France and Spain. Sales revenue for 2010 was $4.33 billion and gross profit was $1.41 billion.

In 2011, WikiLeaks revealed that the corporation had previously lobbied the State Department to prevent the raise of Haiti's minimum-wage to $0.61 an hour from $0.31 an hour.

On July 24, 2013, Hanesbrands agreed to acquire Maidenform for $575 million. On July 15, 2016, Hanes acquired the Australian-based clothing company Pacific Brands

In October 2017, a year before opening the first of the current twenty brick-and-mortar Champion brand retail store in Los Angeles, Hanes announced a $60 million acquisition of Norcross, GA-based Alternative Apparel.

In November 2019, its CFO Barry Hytinen left the firm for a position at the storage and information management services company Iron Mountain. With his departure, chief accounting officer Scott Lewis took over as CFO starting in January 2020.

In April 2021, the company made a statement saying that Michael Dastugue would assume the role of CFO on May 1. According to David Swartz of Morningstar Research Services, Dastugue will be leading Hanesbrands in adapting to a growing customer preference for online shopping.

In 2024, Hanesbrands announced it would move its headquarters to the Park Building in downtown Winston-Salem. Meanwhile, after being there since 1993, the Oak Summit location would be taken over by Carolina University.

In June of the same year, it announced plans to sell the Champion brand to Authentic Brands Group for $1.2 billion. When reporting the change of headquarters, Hanesbrands stated that the relocation "didn't stem" because of the brand sale.

In August 2025, Hanesbrands and Canadian clothing company Gildan announced a merger agreement in which Gildan would acquire Hanesbrands in a cash and stock deal valued at US$2.2 billion. Expected to close in 2025 and early the following year, its shareholders approved the deal in November.

On December 1, 2025, Gildan completed the acquisition of Hanesbrands.

In July 2026, Gildan entered an agreement to sell its Hanesbrands Australia business to BB FIT Investments for US$490 million.

== Partnerships ==
As a collegiate fan apparel supplier, Hanesbrands has partnered with several Universities including Duke University, Florida State, University of Michigan, Auburn University, and Penn State among others. In April 2024, Hanesbrands extended their partnership with Duke for a further 5 years and in May 2024, the brand announced a five-year extension of its current partnership with TCU, one of more than two dozen elite schools that have special retail partnerships with Hanesbrands.

== Controversy ==
=== May 2022 ransomware attack ===
Two separate legal actions were filed in February 2023 regarding a ransomware attack in May 2022. The legal actions were combined in North Carolina on behalf of 75,000 staff members. The lawsuits claimed that the ransomware breach exposed both present and past employees to the risk of identity theft, and asserted that the company lacked sufficient safety protocols in place.

Hanesbrands offered a settlement in April 2024- $50 of store credit or $35 cash.

=== 2024 Worker Rights Consortium Report ===
Hanesbrands and Gildan Activewear were implicated in a Worker Rights Consortium (WRC) report in March 2024 for failing to pay wages to employees at a Central American factory. The report highlights that Central American garment workers, who manufactured products for these companies, were illegally deprived of $2 million in compensation since the factory closed two years ago. According to the report, 831 workers at the APS factory in Ilopango, El Salvador, were unlawfully denied back wages, severance, and other benefits following the facility's closure, as confirmed by the Salvadoran Ministry of Labor.

== See also ==
- Fruit of the Loom
- Jockey International
