= FunGals =

Undergarments for female children

- Product type: Children's underwear
- Current owner: Fruit of the Loom
- Country: USA
- Introduced: May 29, 1987
- Related brands: Funpals
- Markets: Worldwide
- Website: Official site

FunGals are a brand name of children's underwear; manufactured by their parent company Fruit of the Loom. The trademark for the brand name was registered on May 29, 1987.

== Summary ==
Mostly worn by young girls under the age of 12, these undergarments are intended for young girls that is a developmental stepping stone between training pants and adult female undergarments. They are inspired by Saturday morning cartoons, movies, and video games intended for a young female audience. Examples of licenses used include Bananas in Pyjamas, Teletubbies, Scooby-Doo, Dora the Explorer and SpongeBob SquarePants. More recently, licenses like The Smurfs, Angry Birds, and Little Miss have been used for FunGals.

The male equivalent of FunGals are called Funpals (for young boys); they competed against Hanes' Showtoons. As of 2007, both FunGals and Funpals that are sold in the Americas have been manufactured in El Salvador and Honduras, while worldwide manufacturing is done in parts of Europe and North Africa. All FunGals styles use the classic brief design that would be informally described as "granny panties" in adult sizes. Unlike its male equivalent (Funpals), the designs can either be located on the center position of the undergarment or scattered throughout the undergarment.

Sizes for FunGals undergarments typically range from a size XS to a size 3XL (equivalent to a women's M).
