= P.H. Hanes Knitting Company =

Historic industrial complex in North Carolina, US

- U.S. National Register of Historic Places
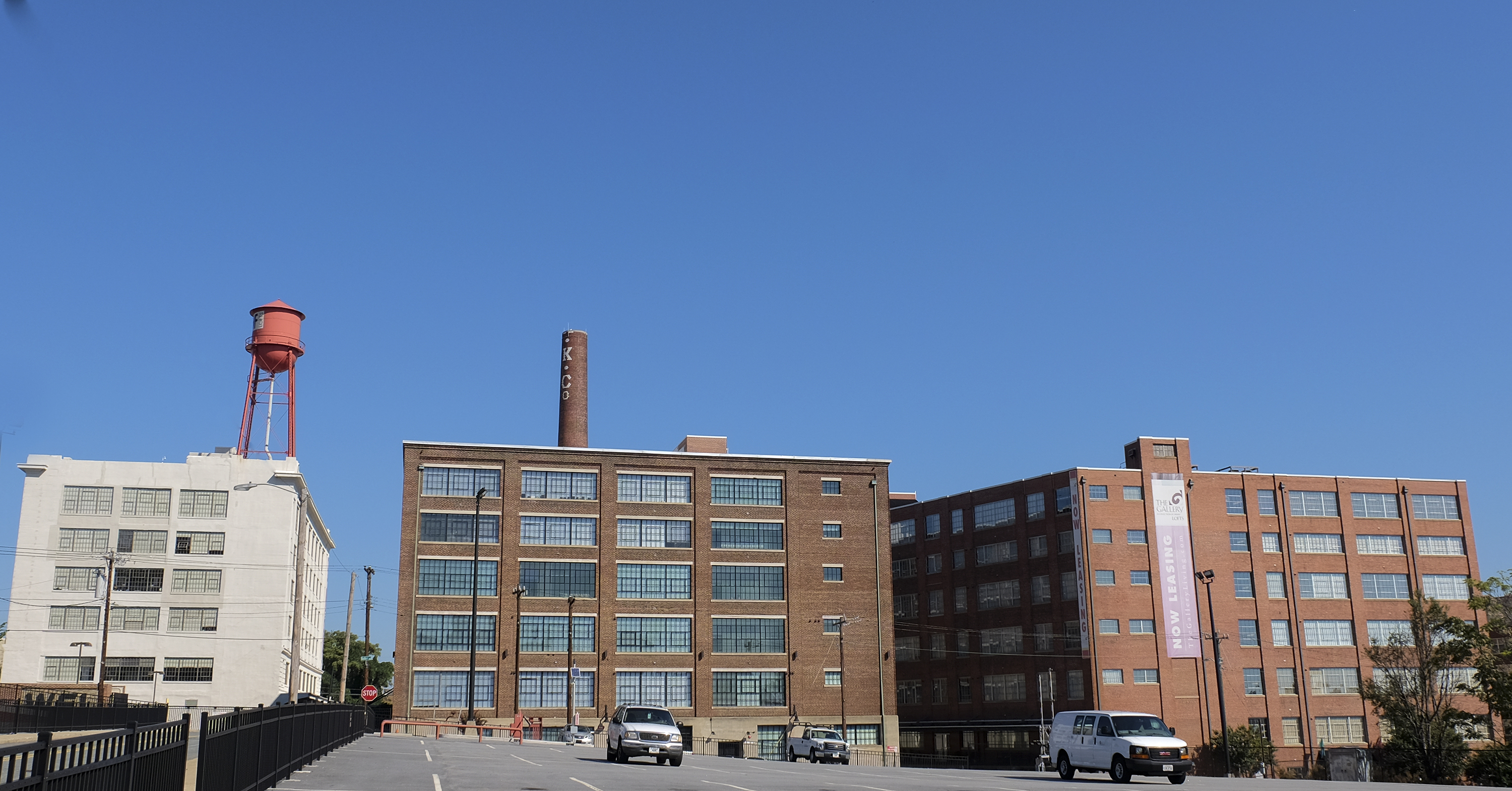

- Location within North Carolina Location within the United States
- Location: 675 N. Main St., 101 W. Sixth St. and 600 N. Chestnut St., Winston-Salem, North Carolina
- Coordinates: 36°6′6″N 80°14′39″W
- Area: 3.3 acres (1.3 ha)
- Built: 1920-1921, 1928, 1940
- Architectural style: Beaux Arts, Industrial
- NRHP reference No.: 05000548
- Added to NRHP: June 10, 2005

P.H. Hanes Knitting Company is a historic textile mill complex located at Winston-Salem, Forsyth County, North Carolina. The complex includes three buildings. The Knitting Building or North Building was built in 1920–1921, and is a six-story, Beaux-Arts-style concrete and steel building sheathed in brick. The Mill Building or East Building was built in 1928, and is a five-story-plus-basement building of concrete, brick, and steel construction. The Warehouse and Shipping Building was built in 1940, and is a six-story steel frame building sheathed in brick. The P.H. Hanes Knitting Company was founded in 1901 by Pleasant H. Hanes, brother of John W. Hanes who founded Shamrock Mills, later Hanes Hosiery. In February 1965, P. H. Hanes Knitting Company merged with Hanes Hosiery. The downtown mill complex closed in 1965. The complex has been converted to loft apartments.

It was listed on the National Register of Historic Places in 2005.
