= KraftWorks =

Advertising agency in New York City

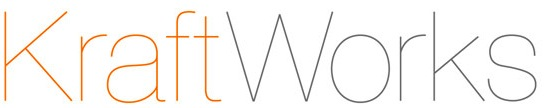
- Website type: Independent
- Founded: 2000
- Headquarters: New York City, United States
- Area served: Worldwide
- Key people: Neil Kraft (President, Chief Creative Officer)
- Industry: Advertising, Marketing
- Website: www.kraftworksnyc.com

KraftWorks is an advertising agency, in New York City, US, founded by Neil Kraft in 2000 after leaving the agency Frierson Mee & Kraft. According to the agency's website, KraftWorks' clients have included Playtex, Aldo, and Joseph Abboud.

== Notable clients ==
KraftWorks has carried out campaigns in the fashion and beauty industry, representing everything from magazines to cosmetics to apparel brands, for

- Bali Intimates
- Playtex
- Elizabeth Arden
- Coty, Inc.
- Glaceau
- Cointreau
- Calvin Klein
- Voss
- Vespa
- Joseph Abboud
- Jantzen
- In 2003, KraftWorks was responsible for Aldo shoes' $5M campaign aimed at international expansion.

Other KraftWorks clients are Ann Taylor, Barneys New York, Boyds Philadelphia, Britney Spears, Celine Din, CK One, Elizabeth Arden Red Door, Elizabeth Taylor Black Pearls, Joseph Ribkoff, La Prairie, Lacoste, Moët & Chandon, Nina Shoes, Physicians Formula, Popchips, Wonderwall line of clothing from surfer Laird Hamilton, Go Smile, International AntiCounterfeiting Coalition, InStyle, J.Crew, Ralph Lauren, Ritani, Robert Marc, Bitten fashion line launched by Sarah Jessica Parker, Smart Water, Speedo, Vespa, Wonderbra and the Sun Moon Stars fragrance by Karl Lagerfeld.
