= Roswell Magill =

American lawyer and government official

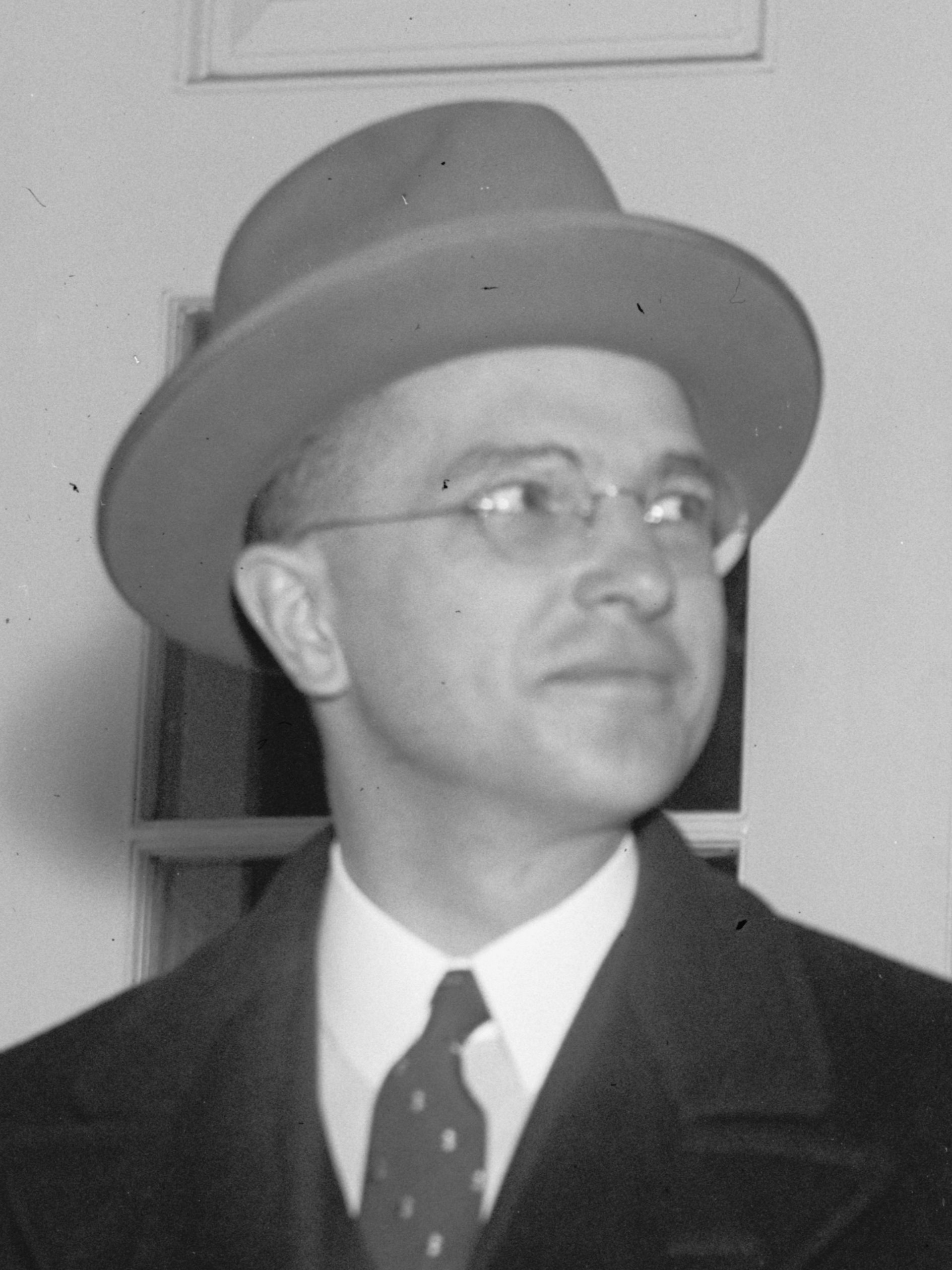

Under Secretary of the Treasury
- In office January 1937 – September 1938
- Nominated by: Franklin D. Roosevelt
- Succeeded by: John W. Hanes

Personal details
- Born: Roswell Foster Magill; November 20, 1895 Auburn, Illinois
- Died: December 17, 1963 (aged 68) New York City
- Party: Republican
- Children: Catherine M. Prelinger, Hugh Stewart Magill
- Education: Dartmouth College; University of Chicago Law School
- Occupation: Tax lawyer

Roswell Foster Magill (November 20, 1895 – December 17, 1963) was an American tax lawyer and Treasury Department official. He was one of the most important tax officials of the 1930s and one of the leading tax experts.

Born in Auburn, Illinois to a teacher and prominent Republican, Hugh S. Magill, who later won a seat in the Illinois Senate, Roswell Magill attended Dartmouth College, graduating in 1916. After a brief stint as an Army captain during World War I, Magill returned to Illinois for law school. He graduated from the University of Chicago Law School in 1920 and began his legal career at the Chicago firm of Alden, Latham & Young.

In 1923 Magill joined the Bureau of Internal Revenue as a special attorney, and within a year he had been promoted to chief attorney for the Treasury Department. As Treasury Secretary Andrew W. Mellon's top lawyer, he helped make the case for major tax reform in 1924. In 1927 he left public service for a faculty post at Columbia Law School, where he introduced a class on federal income taxation.

After briefly serving as special tax advisor to Treasury Secretary Henry Morgenthau in the early 1930s, Magill was nominated by President Roosevelt to become Under Secretary of Treasury in 1937. He supervised preparation of the Tax Revision Studies, a series of reports on every aspect of federal taxation.

In 1938, Magill again left the Treasury, returning to Columbia. Also, he was hired by prestigious New York law firm Cravath, Swaine & Moore in 1943, as a rare lateral partner. He was elected to the American Philosophical Society in 1948.

== Important works ==
- Taxable Income. New York: Ronald Press. 1936.
- The Impact of Federal Taxes. New York: Columbia University Press. 1943.
