= John Wesley Hanes I =

American businessman (1850–1903)

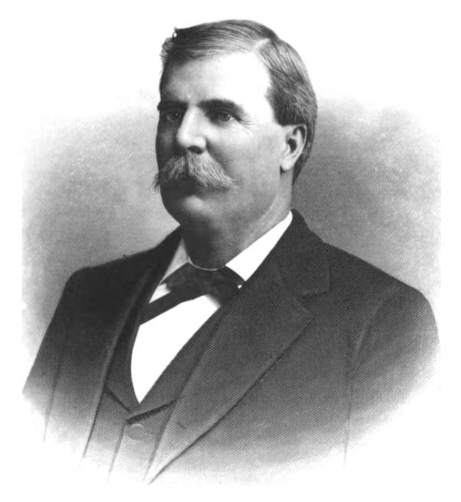
- Born: February 3, 1850; Winston-Salem, North Carolina, United States
- Died: September 23, 1903 (aged 53); Atlantic City, New Jersey, United States
- Resting place: Salem Cemetery, Winston-Salem, North Carolina
- Occupations: Tobacco manufacturer, textile manufacturer
- Known for: Hanes Hosiery
- Spouse: Anna Jannette Hodgin (1857–1947)
- Children: 1) Daisy (b. 1880); 2) Alexander Stephen (1881–1944); 3) Frederick Moir (1883–1946); 4) James Gordon (1886–1972); 5) Robert March (1890–1959); 6) John Wesley II (1892–1987); 7) Edward (b. 1892) (twin); 8) Ralph Phillip (b. 1892) (twin); 9) Lucy Hodgin (1895–1949)
- Parent(s): Alexander Martin Hanes & Jane March
- Relatives: Pleasant Henderson Hanes (brother)

Signature
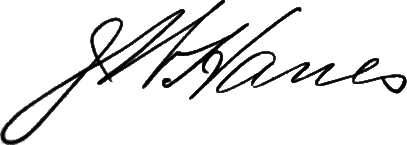

John Wesley Hanes (February 3, 1850 – September 23, 1903) was an American businessman from Winston-Salem, North Carolina, who ran a tobacco company before founding Shamrock Mills in 1901, the company that became Hanes Hosiery Mills.

== Biography ==
Known by his middle name, Wesley Hanes (one of Winston-Salem's wealthiest and most influential businessmen) owned the expensive clothing company in partnership with his brother, Pleasant Henderson Hanes.

Hanes

Using some of the proceeds of their sale of the business to R. J. Reynolds Tobacco Company, Wesley Hanes went into the manufacturing of stockings while his brother set up an underwear manufacturing business under the name P.H. Hanes Knitting Company

Wesley Hanes died of heart trouble on the morning of September 23, 1903, in Atlantic City N.J., aged fifty-three, just two years after creating the business. His son, James Gordon Hanes, would be responsible for the 1965 merger with P. H. Hanes Knitting and for making Hanes Hosiery one of the largest producers in the world of seamless stretch nylon hosiery for women.
