= Catherine M. Prelinger =

American historian (1925–1991)

- Born: Catherine E. Magill; July 17, 1925; New York City, U.S.
- Died: August 31, 1991 (aged 66); New Haven, Connecticut, U.S.
- Other name: Catherine Magill Holden
- Occupations: Historian, editor
- Spouse(s): William Prescott Holden, Ernst Prelinger
- Parent: Roswell Magill

Catherine "Kitty" Magill Holden Prelinger (July 17, 1925 – August 31, 1991) was an American historian. She was assistant editor of the Benjamin Franklin Papers at Yale University, and president of the Berkshire Conference of Women Historians from 1975 to 1977.

== Early life and education ==
Magill was born in New York City, the daughter of Roswell Magill and Katherine Deborah Biggins Magill. Her father was a tax lawyer and government official; her mother, also trained as a lawyer, was a University of Chicago alumna. Catherine Magill attended the Brearley School, earned her bachelor's degree at Vassar College in 1946, and was a member of Phi Beta Kappa. She completed doctoral studies in history at Yale University in 1954, with a dissertation titled "A Decade of Dissent in Germany: An Historical Study of the Society of Protestant Friends and the German Catholic Church, 1840-1848". Her dissertation advisor was Hajo Holborn.

== Career ==
At Yale, Prelinger was assistant editor of the Benjamin Franklin Papers. She was also a research associate and visiting lecturer at the Harvard Divinity School. She was president of the Berkshire Conference of Women Historians from 1975 to 1977, and co-chair of the Coordinating Council for Women in History from 1980 to 1982. She was on the faculty at Quinnipiac University from 1963 to 1970.

== Publications ==
- "Benjamin Franklin and the American Prisoners of War in England during the American Revolution" (1975)
- "Religious Dissent, Women's Rights, and the Hamburger Hochschule fuer das weibliche Geschlecht in mid-nineteenth-century Germany" (1976)
- "Women and Religion, Women as Episcopalians: Some Methodological Observations" (1983)
- "Prelude to Consciousness: Amalie Sieveking and the Female Association for the Care of the Poor and Sick" (1984)
- Charity, Challenge, and Change: Religious Dimensions of the Mid-Nineteenth-Century Women's Movement in Germany (1987)
- "The Frauen-Zeitung (1849–52): Harmony and dissonance in mid-century German feminism" (1989)
- Episcopal Women: Gender, Spirituality, and Commitment in an American Mainline Denomination (Religion in America) (1992, editor; published posthumously)

== Personal life ==
Magill married twice. Her first husband was William Prescott Holden; they married in 1948, and had two daughters. Her second husband was Vienna-born psychotherapist Ernst Prelinger; they married in 1965. Catherine Magill Prelinger died from cancer in 1991, aged 66 years, in New Haven. The CCWH Catherine Prelinger Memorial Award is a postdoctoral scholarship given by the Coordinating Council for Women in History, to "a contemporary scholar whose academic path has not followed the traditional path of uninterrupted study."
