= Joel Smilow =

American businessman and philanthropist

- Occupation: Businessman
- Known for: CEO of Playtex; philanthropy

Joel E. Smilow is an American philanthropist and former CEO of Playtex.

== Early life ==
Joel Smilow was born in Washington, D.C. He graduated from Yale University in 1954. As a student, he was sports director at the campus radio station, WYBC. While he did not play football, he was a strong supporter of Yale's team. He received an MBA from Harvard Business School and served in the Navy.

== Career ==
Smilow, an executive of Esmark/Beatrice, purchased its Playtex division in the late 1980s. He kept Playtex and sold Max Factor to Ron Perelman of Revlon. Smilow led Playtex through four leveraged buyouts between 1985 and 1988. during which he earned $186 million. He spun out Playtex's bra business, Playtex Apparel, for Playtex to focus on tampons and baby bottles. He retired in 1992 and stepped down as chairman in 1995.

He was Daniel Boulud's sole partner for the chef's first restaurant, Daniel, opened in 1993 with an investment of $2 million.

== Philanthropy ==
Smilow is a major donor to Yale University athletics. His 1989 endowment of the football head coach position was the university's first. In 2003, he endowed the head coach positions for men's basketball, women's basketball, and women's lacrosse. Another gift expanded and renovated the Lapham Field House as the Smilow Field Center. He received the Yale Medal in 1992 for service to the university.

He is the lead donor and namesake for the 14-story Smilow Cancer Hospital in the Yale New Haven Hospital, his largest donation. New York University School of Medicine's Joan and Joel Smilow Research Center opened in May 2006.

He is the Boys and Girls Clubs' largest living donor and was the lead donor for a Bridgeport location. Smilow has also donated to charter schools including a network in Washington, D.C., and expansions of the Achievement First schools in New Haven.
