= Auburn, Illinois =

Auburn
- City
- Nickname: The Redbud City
- Location of Auburn in Sangamon County, Illinois.
- Coordinates: 39°34′44″N 89°44′56″W
- Country: United States
- State: Illinois
- County: Sangamon
- Established: February 24, 1853

Area
  - Total: 4.12 sq mi (10.68 km^{2})
  - Land: 4.12 sq mi (10.68 km^{2})
  - Water: 0 sq mi (0.00 km^{2})
- Elevation: 614 ft (187 m)

Population (2020)
  - Total: 4,574
  - Density: 1,109.2/sq mi (428.25/km^{2})
- Time zone: UTC-6 (CST)
  - Summer (DST): UTC-5 (CDT)
- ZIP code: 62615
- Area code(s): 217, 447
- FIPS code: 17-02921
- GNIS feature ID: 2394023
- Website: www.auburnillinois.us

Auburn is a city in Sangamon County, Illinois, United States. As of the 2020 census, Auburn had a population of 4,574. It is part of the Springfield, Illinois metropolitan area.

== History ==
Auburn was originally platted in 1836, a mile north of its present location. It was one of several towns named Auburn that were platted in Illinois during the town lot boom of the 1830s. George and Asa Eastman, who had purchased a large amount of land in the area, platted the town. Their sister Hannah named it for Auburn, Maine, near their family home.

The Eastman family operated a tannery and steam-powered flour mill at Auburn until 1841, when they moved to Springfield. Their departure left Auburn with about six households. Most towns founded in this period failed, but Auburn was able to survive thanks to being located on a postal stagecoach line between Alton and Springfield, so that from 1839 on Auburn was the site of the local post office. The stage coach road followed the present-day path of Illinois State Route 4. Despite its small size in this period, Auburn had a tavern and shops and served as a gathering point for the open-country community around it.

The route of the Alton and Sangamon Railroad, which began running in 1852, bypassed Auburn. In 1853, the town was moved a mile south to its present location on the railroad. By 1860 it had a population of nearly 250 people. The relocated town was initially known as "Wineman" after the local landowner who had induced the railroad to bypass Auburn. When the state legislature incorporated it in 1865, however, the town was renamed Auburn.

From the 1880s to 1924, coal mining dominated Auburn's economy. The miners were mostly new arrivals, but the descendants of old settlers owned many of the local businesses.

In 1896, the Auburn post office was the site of the first Rural Free Delivery service in Illinois, part of a nationwide test. Three rural letter carriers rode 35-mile routes. The experiment was well-received: some local farmers changed their post office to Auburn to take advantage of the new system. The First Assistant Postmaster General noted that the roads in the area were "almost as difficult of transit as when Abraham Lincoln 'rode the circuit'".

A fire in 1910 destroyed much of Auburn's town square.

From 1926 to 1930, US Route 66 passed through Auburn, approximately along the present-day route of State Route 4. A brick-paved portion of the original Route 66 alignment, known as the "Auburn Brick Road", survives just north of Auburn and has been listed in the National Register of Historic Places for its engineering significance. The brick paving was not completed until 1931, when US 66 had already been realigned to the east.

== Geography ==
According to the 2010 census, Auburn has a total area of 4.08 square miles (10.57 km^{2}), all land.

== Demographics ==
Historical population
| Census | Pop. | Note | %± |
|---|---|---|---|
| 1880 | 288 | | — |
| 1890 | 874 | | 203.5% |
| 1900 | 1,281 | | 46.6% |
| 1910 | 1,814 | | 41.6% |
| 1920 | 2,660 | | 46.6% |
| 1930 | 2,242 | | −15.7% |
| 1940 | 1,952 | | −12.9% |
| 1950 | 1,963 | | 0.6% |
| 1960 | 2,209 | | 12.5% |
| 1970 | 2,594 | | 17.4% |
| 1980 | 3,616 | | 39.4% |
| 1990 | 3,724 | | 3.0% |
| 2000 | 4,317 | | 15.9% |
| 2010 | 4,771 | | 10.5% |
| 2020 | 4,574 | | −4.1% |
U.S. Decennial Census

=== 2020 census ===
As of the 2020 census, Auburn had a population of 4,574. The median age was 38.4 years. 25.6% of residents were under the age of 18 and 14.6% of residents were 65 years of age or older. For every 100 females there were 95.9 males, and for every 100 females age 18 and over there were 90.9 males age 18 and over.

0.0% of residents lived in urban areas, while 100.0% lived in rural areas.

There were 1,786 households in Auburn, of which 36.9% had children under the age of 18 living in them. Of all households, 50.9% were married-couple households, 15.8% were households with a male householder and no spouse or partner present, and 26.0% were households with a female householder and no spouse or partner present. About 24.3% of all households were made up of individuals and 10.4% had someone living alone who was 65 years of age or older.

There were 1,914 housing units, of which 6.7% were vacant. The homeowner vacancy rate was 2.6% and the rental vacancy rate was 9.3%.

Racial composition as of the 2020 census
| Race | Number | Percent |
|---|---|---|
| White | 4,215 | 92.2% |
| Black or African American | 34 | 0.7% |
| American Indian and Alaska Native | 21 | 0.5% |
| Asian | 14 | 0.3% |
| Native Hawaiian and Other Pacific Islander | 0 | 0.0% |
| Some other race | 42 | 0.9% |
| Two or more races | 248 | 5.4% |
| Hispanic or Latino (of any race) | 91 | 2.0% |

=== 2000 census ===
At the 2000 census there were 4,317 people in 1,618 households, including 1,187 families, in the city. The population density was 1,368.0 inhabitants per square mile (528.2/km^{2}). There were 1,753 housing units at an average density of 555.5 per square mile (214.5/km^{2}). The racial makeup of the city was 98.36% White, 0.30% African American, 0.16% Native American, 0.28% Asian, 0.30% from other races, and 0.60% from two or more races. Hispanic or Latino of any race were 0.76%.

Of the 1,618 households 42.0% had children under the age of 18 living with them, 56.6% were married couples living together, 13.2% had a female householder with no husband present, and 26.6% were non-families. 22.9% of households were one person and 9.7% were one person aged 65 or older. The average household size was 2.63 and the average family size was 3.09.

The age distribution was 30.4% under the age of 18, 7.5% from 18 to 24, 33.1% from 25 to 44, 17.5% from 45 to 64, and 11.5% 65 or older. The median age was 33 years. For every 100 females, there were 88.2 males. For every 100 females age 18 and over, there were 82.4 males.

The median household income was $43,250 and the median family income was $49,200. Males had a median income of $34,339 versus $24,167 for females. The per capita income for the city was $18,368. About 4.8% of families and 5.5% of the population were below the poverty line, including 8.0% of those under age 18 and 4.5% of those age 65 or over.

== Notable people ==
- Dutch Leonard, MLB pitcher for 20 years, was born in Auburn.
- Roswell Magill (1895–1963), a leading tax expert of the 1930s, born in Auburn.
