= Shamrock Mills =

Historic building in North Carolina, US

- U.S. National Register of Historic Places
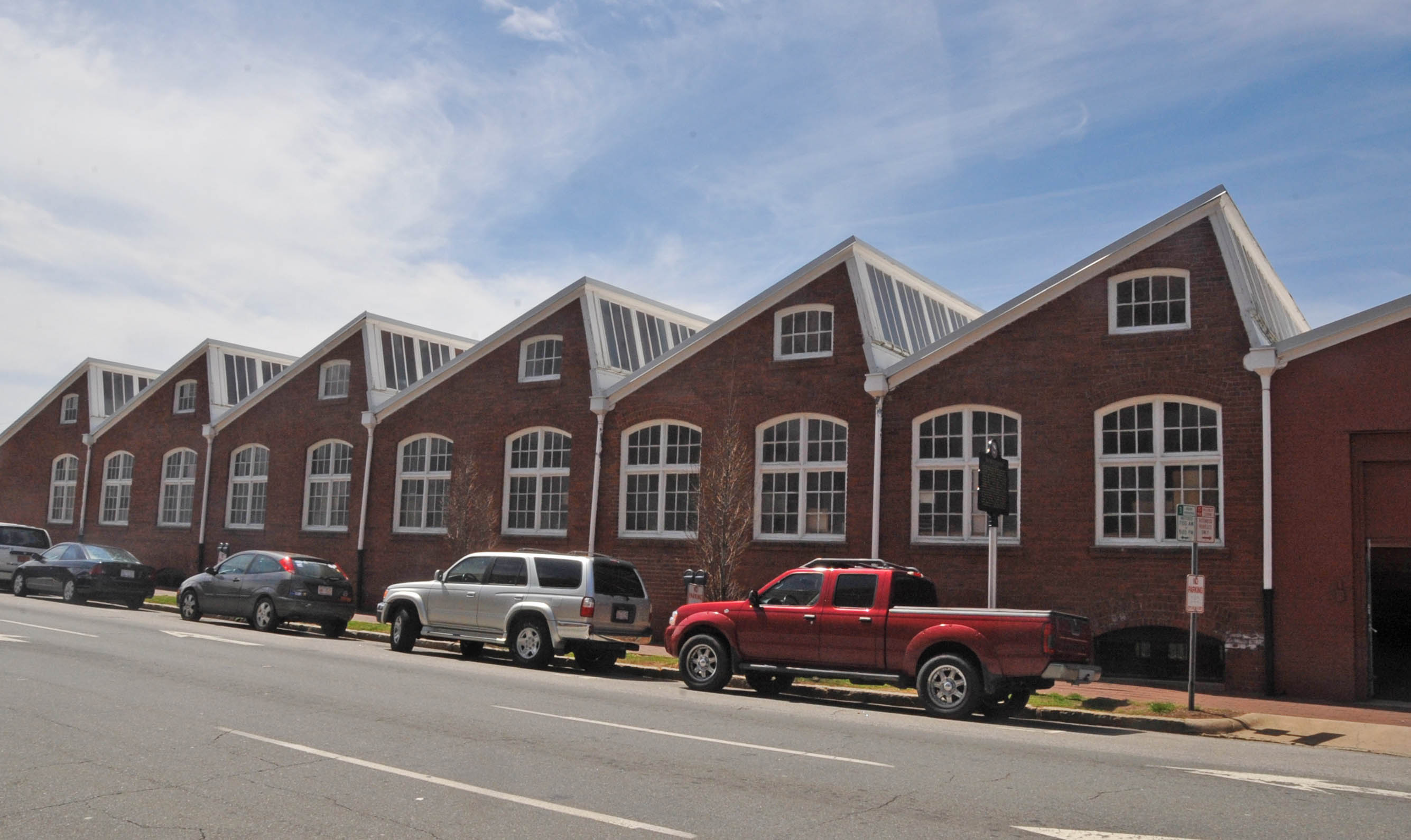
- Shamrock Mills, September 2007

- Location within North Carolina Location within the United States
- Location: 3rd and Marshall Sts., Winston-Salem, North Carolina
- Coordinates: 36°5′45″N 80°14′55″W
- Area: less than one acre
- Built: 1911, 1925
- NRHP reference No.: 78001951
- Added to NRHP: May 23, 1978

Shamrock Mills, also known as Hanes Hosiery Mill #1, is a historic textile mill building located at Winston-Salem, Forsyth County, North Carolina. It was built in 1911, and is a one-story brick building with daylight basement. It is six bays deep and extends in seven sections with a rhythmic saw-tooth roof and six-foot skylights. An addition was built in 1925. It was the first building used by the Hanes Hosiery Company. The mill closed in 1926, and the building subsequently housed a Cadillac dealership. The building houses the Sawtooth School for Visual Art.

It was listed on the National Register of Historic Places in 1978.
