= Esmark =

Esmark is a surname. Notable people with the surname include:

- Birgitte Esmark (1841–1897), Norwegian malacologist
- Jens Esmark (1763–1839), Danish-Norwegian mineralogist, study of glaciers
- Lars Mathias Hille Esmark (1908–1998), Norwegian civil servant
- Morten Thrane Esmark (1801-1882), Norwegian priest and mineralogist

== See also ==
- Esmark Inc., an American company founded in 2008, operating mainly in the steel industry
- Esmark Glacier, glacier in South Georgia Island
- Esmarkbreen, glacier in Svalbard
- JBS USA, successor of former holding company Esmark
