= Underoos =

Brand of children's underwear

Wonder Woman Underoos

Underoos is a brand of underwear primarily for children, produced by the Fruit of the Loom company. The packages include a matching top and bottom for either boys or girls, featuring a character from popular entertainment media, especially superhero comics, animated programs, and fantasy/science fiction. Typically, the garment mimics the distinctive costume of the character, encouraging the wearer to pretend to be the character. In other designs, it features an image of the character or logo on the undergarments.

== History ==
Underoos Promotional Ad, 1978

Underoos were developed as a product idea in 1977 by an independent entrepreneur, Larry Weiss, who obtained licenses for the four major comic character groups (DC Comics, Marvel Comics, Hanna-Barbera, Archie Comics), which included Superman, Batman, Shazam, Wonder Woman, Supergirl, Spider-Man, and Captain America.

The product idea was first offered to Hanes, but was rejected. Scott Paper company pursued development, but ultimately decided to not market the product. Fruit of the Loom had been engaged as supplier of the blank underwear and another vendor engaged to apply transfers. Informed of Scott Paper Company's decision to not market this novel product, Fruit of the Loom inquired if they would be permitted to market the product, now fully developed. Weiss agreed, and in 1978 Fruit of the Loom bought Underoos.

Early advertisements for the brand featured images of boys and girls in wrestler poses with the marketing slogan "When the color lasts, and the fit lasts, and the quality lasts, and the joy lasts, it's got to be Underoos...the underwear that's fun to wear."

The product was tested in three markets including the New York Metropolitan area. Retailer and consumer demand was so strong the product was immediately expanded to national distribution.

Fruit of the Loom licensed out the Underoos brand name to Bioworld, which made Underoos in adult sizes. By the end of 2020, Underoos was selling out its existing stock. Its homepage changed to a thank-you notice to customers in 2021.

== In pop culture ==
=== Marvel Cinematic Universe ===
In Captain America: Civil War, Iron Man shouts out "Underoos" at Spider-Man as a signal for the teenager to join the superhero confrontation and steal Captain America's shield. The nickname references Spider-Man's youth and suit. The Underoos reference resulted in numerous memes circulating online and being compiled into collections inspired by the movie scene.

Due to the product being sold predominately in America and being unfamiliar internationally, the brand name Underoos was exchanged for relevant regional meanings during the movie's translations. Some of the alternative names shouted by Iron Man to Spider-Man include the nicknames collants (French), pirralho (Portuguese), pijamalı çocuk (Turkish), joljori (Korean), and rugdalózós (Hungarian).

== Styles ==
- The A-Team
- Alvin and the Chipmunks
- Aquaman
- Archies - Veronica
- Archies - Archie
- Barbie
- Batgirl
- Batman
- Boba Fett
- Buck Rogers
- C-3PO
- Captain America
- Captain Power and the Soldiers of the Future
- Catwoman
- Chewbacca
- Darth Vader
- Deadpool
- Defenders of the Earth
- Despicable Me
- Disney's Adventures of the Gummi Bears
- Dukes of Hazzard - Bo & Luke
- Dukes of Hazzard - Daisy
- E.T. the Extra-Terrestrial
- Ewoks
- The Flash
- G.I. Joe
- GoBots
- Green Lantern
- Gremlins
- Han Solo
- Harry Potter - Gryffindor
- Harry Potter - Hufflepuff
- Harry Potter - Ravenclaw
- Harry Potter - Slytherin
- He-Man
- Hot Rod
- The Incredible Hulk
- Iron Man
- The Joker
- The Séance (Klaus Hargreeves)
- Knight Rider
- Lazer Tag Academy
- Lone Ranger
- Luke Skywalker - Return of the Jedi
- Luke Skywalker (Flight Suit)
- M.A.S.K.
- Monchhichis
- Ms. Pac-Man
- Pac-Man
- Peanuts
- Plastic Man
- Power Rangers - Green Ranger
- Power Rangers - Pink Ranger
- Princess Leia - Return of the Jedi
- Princess Leia - The Empire Strikes Back
- Punisher
- R2-D2
- The Real Ghostbusters
- Robin
- Roger Rabbit
- Scooby-Doo
- Shazam
- Spider-Man
- Spider-Woman (Jessica Drew)
- Stormtrooper
- Supergirl
- Superman
- Teenage Mutant Ninja Turtles
- The Thing
- Thundercats
- Tonto
- Transformers
- Twiki
- Wonder Woman
- Yoda
