= Champion (sportswear) =

Athletic apparel brand

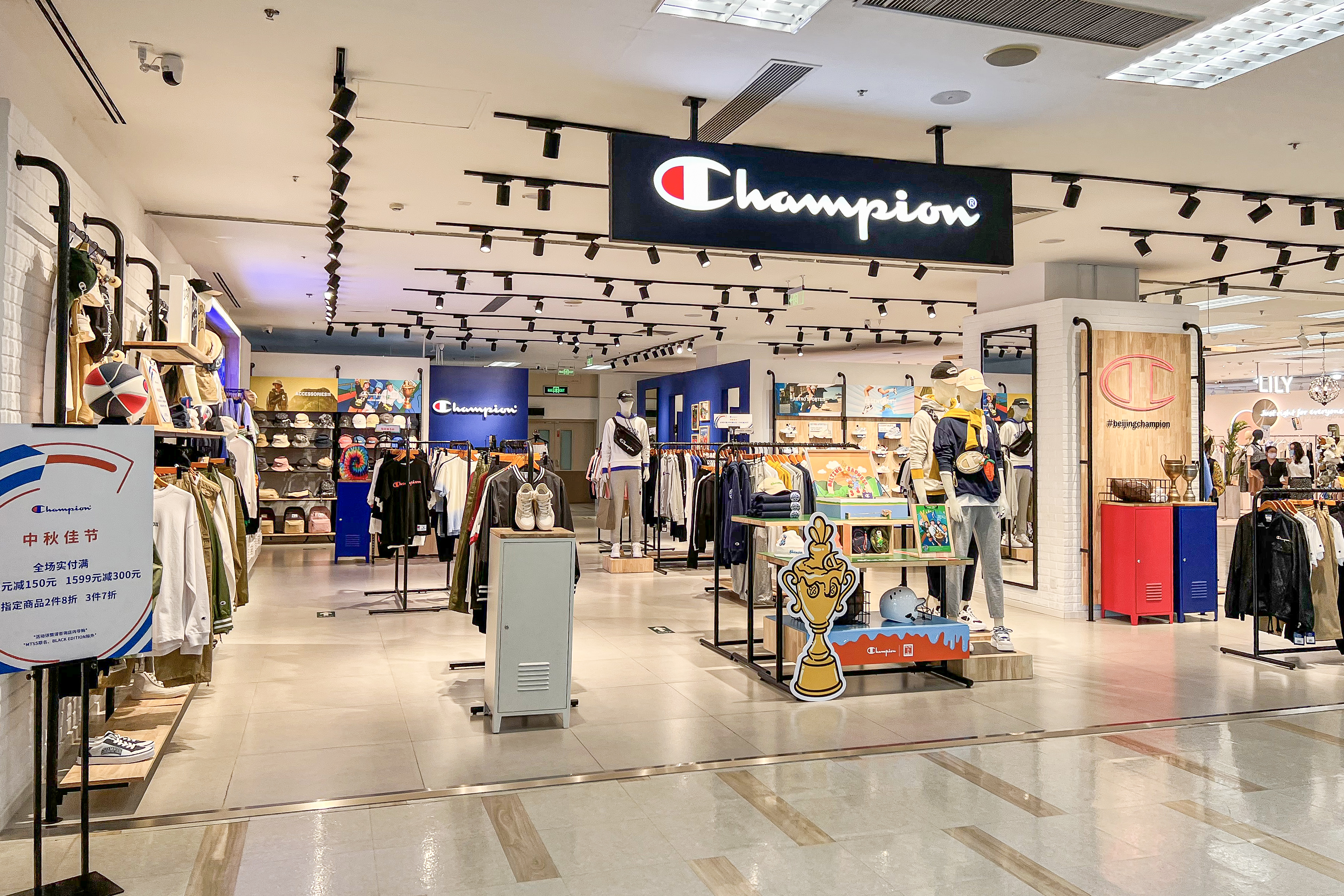
- Champion store in Beijing, China, 2022
- Formerly: Knickerbocker Knitting Co. (1919–1930s); Champion Knitting Mills Inc. (1930s–present)
- Type: Private (1919–1989); Subsidiary (1989–present)
- Industry: Textiles; Apparel; Accessories; Footwear
- Founded: 1919; 107 years ago
- Founder: Feinbloom Brothers
- Fate: 1989: Acquired by Sara Lee Corp., other owners since
- Headquarters: New York City, U.S.
- Number of locations: 38 stores (2021)
- Area served: North America; Europe; Asia; Brazil
- Products: Clothing; Footwear
- Parent: Authentic Brands Group (2024–present)
- Website: champion.com

Champion (also stylized as Champion U.S.A.) is an American clothing brand specializing in sportswear, owned and marketed by Authentic Brands. The company was originally based in Rochester, New York, prior to its acquisition by Sara Lee in 1989.

Products manufactured and sold by Champion include casual wear clothing (t-shirts, hoodies, sweatpants, shorts, jackets, underwear), hosiery (leggings, socks), footwear (sandals, sneakers) and accessories (bags, hats, collectibles).

== History ==
=== Founding and early years (1919–1929) ===
The company was started in 1919 as Knickerbocker Knitting Mills by Simon Feinbloom and his sons William and Abraham. In 1922, brothers Bill and Abe Feinbloom inherited the company from Simon and renamed it Champion Knitwear Mills, Inc., incorporating it on January 3, 1924. One of Champion's earliest institutional partnerships was with Wentworth Military Academy, which purchased Champion sweaters as part of its cadet uniform. The hooded sweatshirt, referred to at the time as a "sideline parka," was developed during this period for athletes to wear on the sidelines during games, making Champion the first manufacturer to produce the garment now widely known as the hoodie. The company soon signed an agreement with the Michigan Wolverines to produce uniforms for their teams. In the 1930s, the company was renamed "Champion Knitting Mills Inc.", producing sweatshirts and hoodies. Soon after, Champion products were adopted by the US Military Academy to be used during training exercises and physical education classes.

=== Reverse Weave patent and wartime expansion (1930s–1940s) ===
In the early 1930s, a Champion salesman named Samuel Friedland identified that cotton sweatshirts shrank significantly during laundering. By rotating the direction of the fabric's grain 90 degrees, cutting on the cross-grain rather than the standard machine direction, shrinkage was substantially reduced. On August 9, 1938, a patent was issued to Friedland, assignor to Champion Knitwear Co. Inc., for this construction method, titled "Athletic Shirt And Method of Making The Same." The garment was cut from a single piece of fabric with a continuous shoulder and sleeve, and fitted with the rib collar, cuff, and waistband that became characteristic of Champion sweatshirts. This method became known and marketed as the Reverse Weave.

In 1931, the Norwich Knitting Mill, a manufacturer that worked with Champion, became the first company in the world to produce licensed Mickey Mouse apparel, securing a license from Walt Disney Enterprises to manufacture textile goods featuring Disney characters.

During World War II, Champion supplied the US military and military academies with t-shirts and sweatshirts, including garments featuring unit-based insignias, as part of uniform-wear for servicemembers.

=== The Infamous 2nd Patent Reverse Weave garment (1952) ===
On October 14, 1952, the US Patent Office granted a second patent to Friedland and William Feinbloom, assignors to Champion Knitwear Co. Inc., for an improved construction titled "Athletic Garment Or The Like." This second patent introduced side panels to address width-wise shrinkage, complementing the original 1938 patent's solution to length-wise shrinkage. The side-panel construction established by this patent became the industry standard and remains in widespread use today. In 2017, Champion's Reverse Weave hoodie was featured in the Museum of Modern Art's exhibition Items: Is Fashion Modern?, and in 2018 entered MoMA's permanent collection.

=== Logo, performance fabric, and women's athleticwear (1950s–1960s) ===
In 1956, Champion introduced its stylized "C" logo still used today. The stylized "C" script was originally printed in one color on internal garment labels. The C-logo with the red pip was introduced at Notre Dame football and basketball athletic teams by 1967, and became a sleeve patch by the 1980s.

In 1967, Champion debuted nylon mesh for football uniforms, a lightweight, breathable perforated synthetic fabric designed to reduce heat exhaustion for athletes. Prior to this innovation, athletic uniforms typically used heavier synthetic materials that retained moisture and limited breathability. The mesh jersey was subsequently adopted across basketball, track, lacrosse, and other sports, becoming an industry standard.

In 1968, Champion introduced Lady Champion, a line of women's athletic and physical education apparel that offered fitted cuts and styles tailored to female athletes, a market that had largely been served by garments designed for men. The line was widely adopted across colleges, high schools, and elementary schools.

=== The Jogbra (1970s) ===
In 1977, Lisa Lindahl, Hinda Miller, and Polly Smith invented the first sports bra, the Jogbra, by prototyping a garment from two men's jockstraps. The Jogbra was patented in 1979. Champion became a distributor and later manufacturer of the Jogbra; the Jogbra brand was sold to Champion Sportswear in 1994.

=== NBA partnership and youth culture (1980s–1990s) ===
By the 1980s, Champion had become the official outfitter of all US Military Academies. During the same period, the brand gained visibility within youth subcultures including hip hop, street art, and skateboarding communities. At the 1988 Seoul Olympics, Champion provided uniforms for the US team's ceremonial walk.

Champion was acquired by Sara Lee Corporation in 1989. Champion produced uniforms for all the NBA teams during the 1990s and some NFL teams during the 1970s to the 1990s, for both on-field and retail purposes. It has also produced sportswear for many major colleges. From 1991–92 through the 1996–97 season, Champion held the exclusive uniform license for the NBA, outfitting all teams and serving as the sole producer of replica jerseys league-wide. From 1997–98, the NBA divided on-court uniform licenses among multiple brands, though Champion retained the exclusive replica jersey license for all 29 teams. Champion was also the uniform manufacturer of the Olympic basketball team that competed at the 1992 Summer Olympics.

From 2008, Champion produced kits for Premier League side, Wigan Athletic F.C., the Welsh national men's soccer team and jerseys for the Greek national men's basketball team, also Pallacanestro Cantù, in Italy.

Champion supplied the football uniforms for the Notre Dame Fighting Irish. In 2001, Notre Dame signed an exclusive five-year agreement with Adidas, which ended the partnership that Champion had with the university for over fifty years.

=== High fashion collaborations and cultural recognition (2010s) ===
In 2012, designer Virgil Abloh launched his first label, Pyrex Vision, using Champion blanks — hoodies, t-shirts, and shorts — as the foundation for the collection, stamping them with his signature block lettering. Abloh later founded Off-White, and Champion and Off-White subsequently formalized a collaboration partnership. After Abloh's death in 2021, his archive reissued selected designs from the collaboration.

In its Spring/Summer 2017 collection, Vetements, the label founded by Demna and Guram Gvasalia, included a collaboration with Champion as part of a broader collection featuring 18 brand partnerships that blurred the line between high fashion and everyday clothing. The collection attracted significant attention in the fashion industry and contributed to broader interest in sportswear heritage brands within luxury contexts.

In June 2024, Hanesbrands announced plans to sell the Champion brand to Authentic Brands for $1.2 billion. On October 1, it was announced that the transaction had been completed. Champion's CHAMPION TEAMWEAR is now owned by Unrivaled Teamwear, which is a brand partner for the champion's team apparel similar to how Under Armour's licensed apparel is handled. The parent company of Unrivaled Teamwear is Authentic who owns Champion.

=== Partnerships (2024–present) ===
Following Authentic Brands Group's completion of its Champion acquisition in September 2024, the brand pursued a strategy of returning to professional sports leagues. Over the following year, Champion secured officially licensed apparel partnerships with the National Hockey League, Minor League Baseball, and the Premier Lacrosse League.

In April 2024, Champion Teamwear signed LSU gymnast Haleigh Bryant — a 22-time All-American — as an official sportswear partner and brand ambassador, collaborating on a line of gymnastics leotards and activewear. Champion also announced sponsorships of rising UK boxers Francesca Hennessy and Harlem Eubank in 2024, as part of its EMEA investment in emerging athletic talent.

In February 2025, Target Corporation announced a retail partnership with Champion, with a new collection spanning over 500 pieces of activewear, accessories, and sporting goods for adults and children, available in Target stores and on Target.com from August 2025. Champion also opened a flagship Milan store at Via Torino 19, and named Chinese actor Ding Yuxi as its Greater China brand ambassador. In South America, Champion partnered with Brazilian streetwear brand SUFGANG on a capsule collection.

In May 2025, Champion announced a long-term partnership with UFC Heavyweight Champion Tom Aspinall, launching a co-designed capsule collection titled "Heavyweight Champion" incorporating Champion's Reverse Weave construction.

In June 2025, Champion announced a license to produce officially licensed NFL apparel, debuting an inaugural collection at Fanatics Fest NYC featuring gear for the New York Giants, New York Jets, Dallas Cowboys, Washington Commanders, and Philadelphia Eagles, alongside expanded NHL offerings for the New York Rangers, New Jersey Devils, and New York Islanders.

In July 2025, Champion launched its "Champions for Champion" global campaign, featuring Olympic gold medalist and mental health advocate Aly Raisman, rapper The Kid LAROI, model Romeo Beckham, gold medal freestyle skier and LGBTQ+ activist Gus Kenworthy, martial arts prodigy Rayna Vallandingham, K-pop choreographer Lia Kim, Colombian actor-musician Juan Palau, and reality competition winner and rare disease fundraiser Jeffrey Randall Allen. A second iteration of the campaign for Spring/Summer 2026 expanded the roster to include NBA forward Kyle Kuzma, NFL quarterback Jaxson Dart, Olympic surfer Caroline Marks, and model Winnie Harlow, with The Kid LAROI and Romeo Beckham returning as continuing ambassadors.

== Sponsorships ==
=== Basketball ===
- (Australia) (New Zealand) Australian National Basketball League

== Past sponsorships ==
In the past, Champion manufactured uniforms mostly for basketball and American football teams, most notable its long-time partnership with the National Basketball Association (NBA) that extended until 2004, when Reebok took over. Champion also sponsored International association FIBA until 2017.

Below are lists of some of them, organized by sport:

=== Gridiron football ===
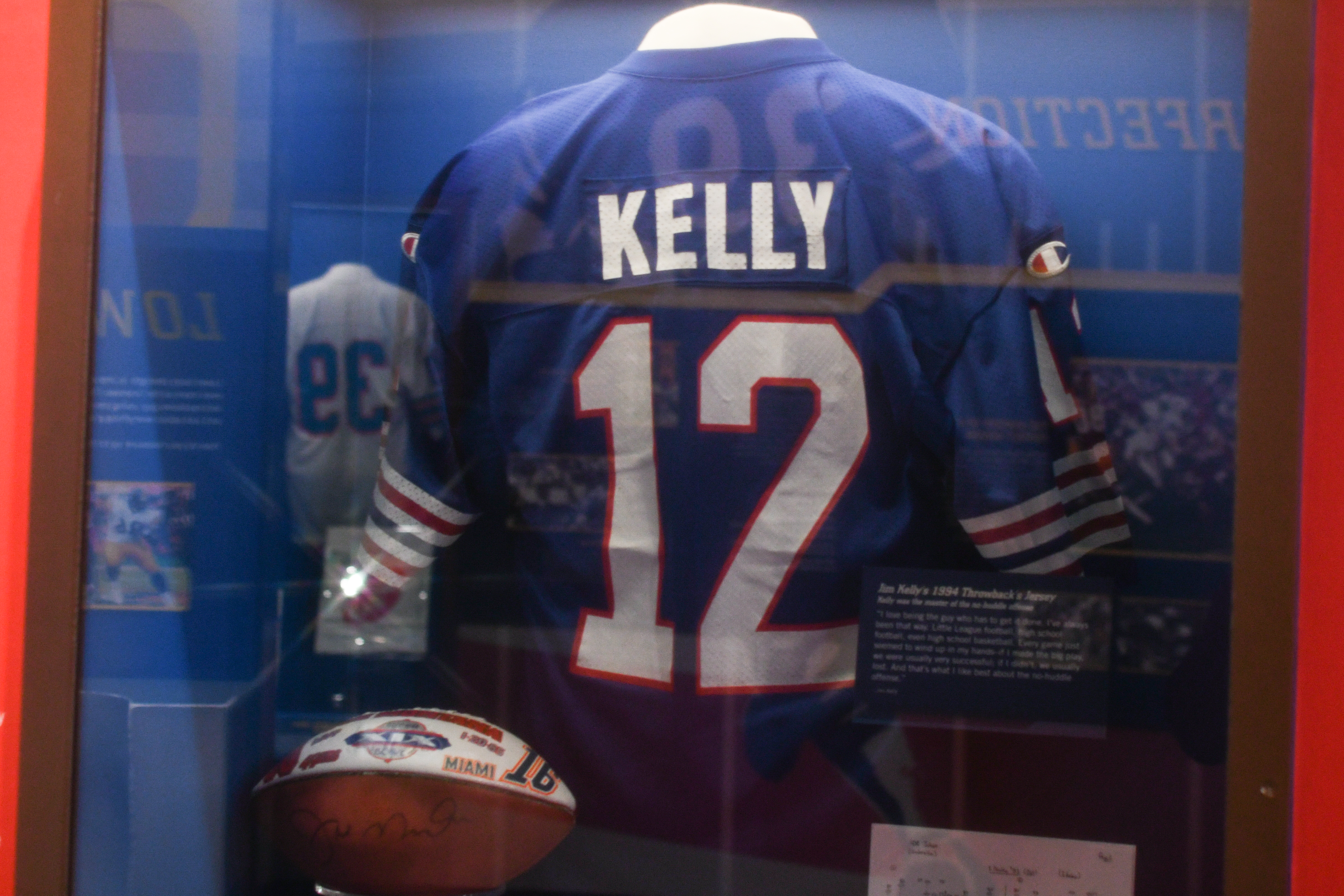
1994 Buffalo Bills' Jim Kelly jersey made by Champion

- (United States) XFL (2001)
- (Canada) CFL (1987–89)
- (United States) Chicago Bears (1993–95)
- (United States) Cincinnati Bengals (1989–96, 1998)
- (United States) Buffalo Bills (1988–96)
- (United States) Indianapolis Colts (1987–92)
- (United States) Atlanta Falcons (1990–91)
- (United States) New York Jets (1990–96)
- (United States) New Orleans Saints (1990–96)

=== Soccer ===
- (England) Wigan Athletic (2008–09)
- (France) Sochaux (2003–05, including the last season as main sponsor of the club)
- (Italy) Parma (1999–2005, including the last season as main sponsor of the club)
- (United States) Cosmos (1975–76)
- Wales national team (2008–10)

=== Basketball ===
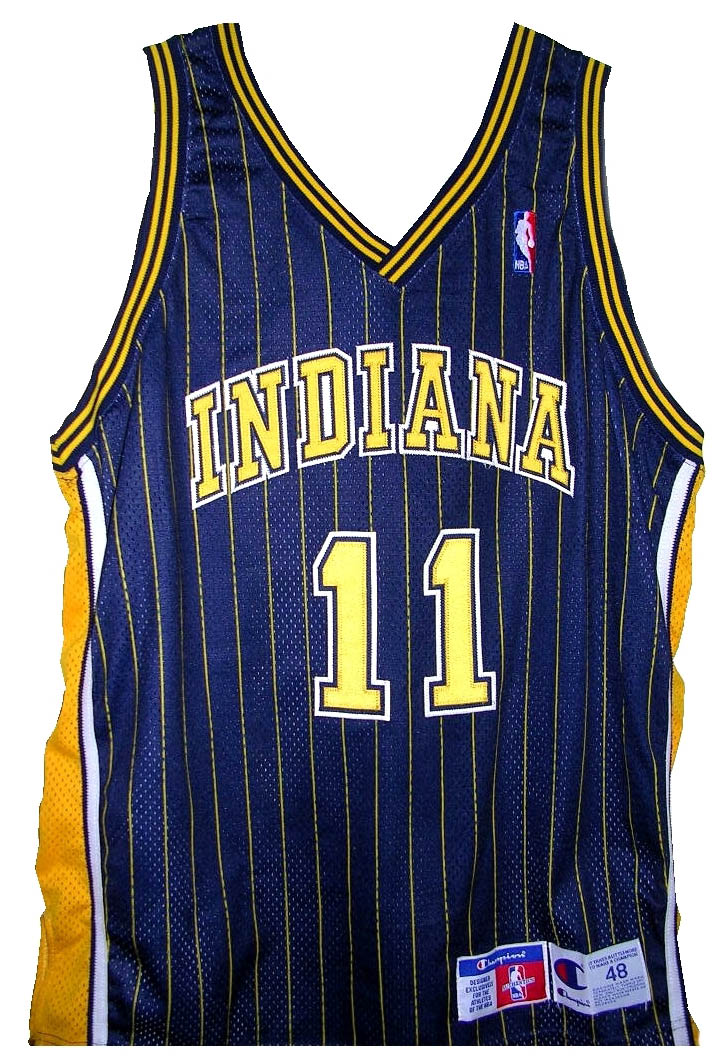
Indiana Pacers' Jamaal Tinsley jersey by Champion, worn in 2001

- (Canada) (United States) NBA – all teams (1990–1997), some teams (1997–2002)
- (United States) U.S. national team (1992–2000)
- Italy national men's team (1996–2016)
- (Croatia) Zadar
- (Italy) Virtus Bologna (1999–2005)
- (Serbia) FMP
- (Serbia) Dynamic VIP PAY

=== Lacrosse ===
- United States national team

== Merchandising licenses ==
Replica jersey uniforms made by Champion in the licensed sports business:

- (Canada) (United States) NBA – all teams (1990–2002)
- (United States) NFL – all teams (1980s–2000)
- (United States) XFL – all teams (2001)
