= L'eggs =

Pantyhose in egg-shaped packaging

- Logo until 2024
- Product type: Hosiery, shapewear, leggings
- Current owner: Windsong Global LLC
- Country: United States
- Introduced: February 16, 1970; 56 years ago
- Markets: United States
- Previous owners: Hanesbrands (1970–2023)
- Website: www.leggs.com

L'eggs is a brand of pantyhose, introduced in 1970 by Hanes. The brand's novel developments were its egg-shaped plastic product container, the shift to consignment sales in drug stores and groceries, and the in-store product racks designed to emphasize its unique packaging. The brand logo hinted at a pair of chicks or eggs in the lettering.

L'eggs was an immediate success, knocking out many competitors and becoming a tremendous profit stream for Hanes. Customers liked the egg-style packaging and the convenience of buying pantyhose closer to home during their usual errands. Celebrity endorsements helped to keep the brand in the forefront. The plastic egg packaging was used for home handicrafts and as a toy for children. The success of the product line continued through the 1970s and 1980s, with L'eggs standing as the largest pantyhose brand in the US.

In the 1990s, office workers increasingly adopted casual dress styles, and many women in the workplace stopped wearing pantyhose. L'eggs downsized in the mid-1990s even as they retained a large share of the reduced marketplace. They also exchanged their plastic egg for a more environmentally friendly cardboard cylinder and dome.

== History ==
=== Development ===
L'eggs was the brainchild of Hanes executive Robert Elberson, who put together a secret project in the basement at the Hanes factory in Winston-Salem, North Carolina. Elberson's vision was that women should be able to buy pantyhose more conveniently at supermarkets and drug stores rather than at women's clothing boutiques or department stores. All pantyhose at the time was sold in the form of a clear plastic envelope containing the hosiery wrapped around a cardboard insert. The project team was tasked with finding a new packaging design that would appeal to women as an impulse purchase. Roger Ferriter of the prominent New York creative agency Lubalin, Smith, Carnase, Inc. designed the L'eggs name and distinctive egg-shaped containers. Fred Howard created the product sales racks which were vertically oriented white plastic oversized eggs, "exploded" in the middle to contain circular racks.

=== Introduction ===
1971 magazine advertisement

Hanes would announce the impending launch of L'eggs in late January 1970, with test-marketing beginning in February. New York ad agency Dancer Fitzgerald Sample would be responsible for the brand's early advertising. The product was so successful that Hanes increased their advertising outlay from $250,000 annually to $10 million in the first years. Total sales in 1970 was reported as $9 million, rising to $110 million in 1973. In 1972, L'eggs predicted they would move 100 million units, while spending 20 percent of their budget on promotion. David E. Harrold, president of Hanes knitwear division and second-in-command to Elberson, was named "Man of the Year" by the Point-of-Purchase Advertising Institute. Harrold had organized the product rollout of L'eggs. By 1977, L'eggs had captured 15 percent of the total US hosiery market, becoming the biggest single brand in American hosiery. L'eggs carried 38 percent of hosiery sold in drug and food stores in the US in 1977.

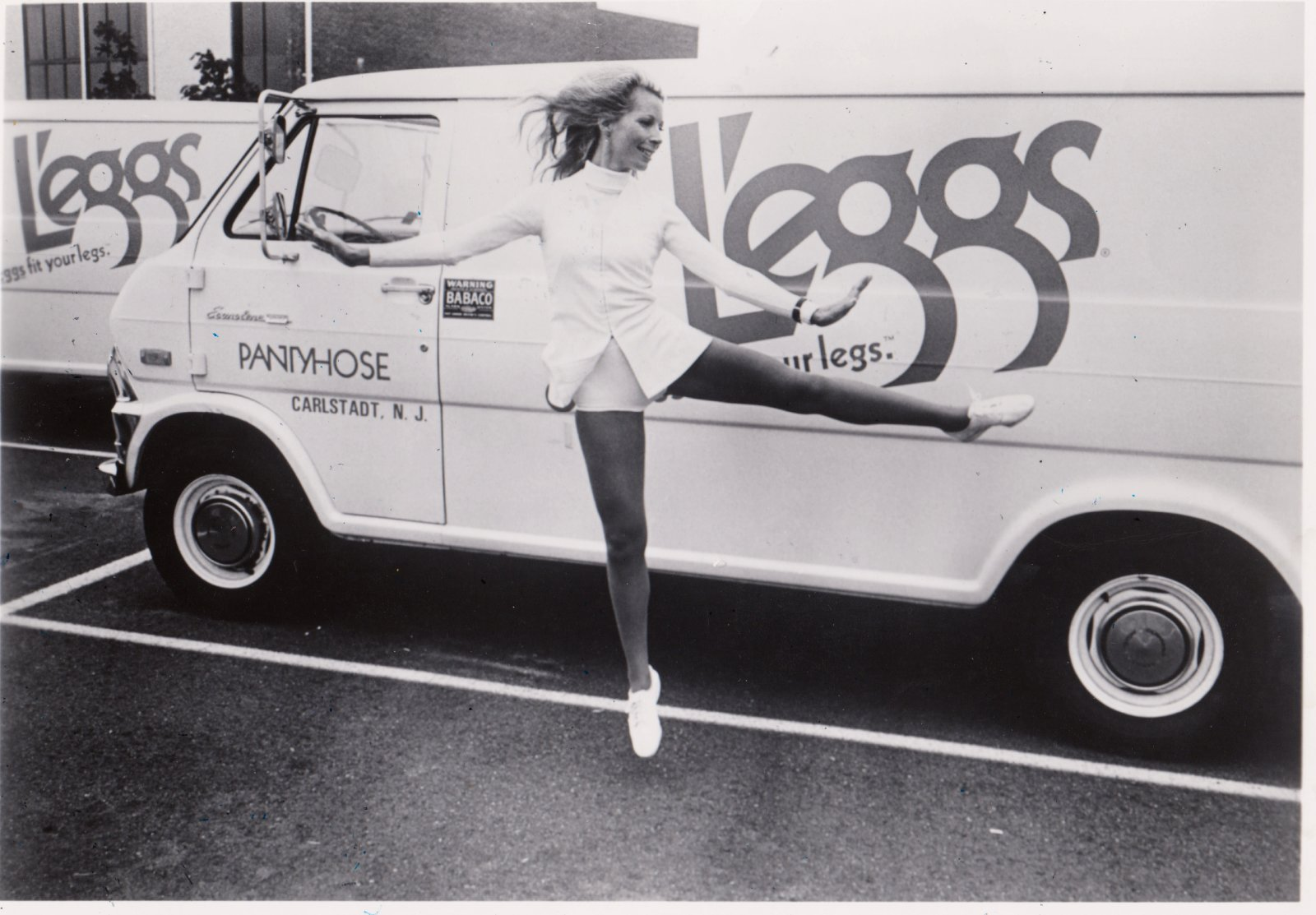
Jacki Sorensen designed an aerobic dancing workout for L'eggs distributors in 1973.

L'eggs were sold on consignment and distributed by a fleet of drivers, the majority of them women, who stocked the tall displays in every store, and kept track of sales figures to maintain an accurate weekly inventory using a central computer database. When the Sheer Energy line was introduced in fall 1973, L'eggs hired aerobic dancing pioneer Jacki Sorensen to devise an exercise regimen for the distributors. She traveled to 26 cities and taught 600 women.

The price of L'eggs was set slightly higher than competing brands, because of the greater convenience of location. The freestanding displays occupied only about 2 feet of circular floor space (0.6 meters in diameter), and held 288 plastic eggs of different colors and styles. The customer could rotate any one of the eight circular shelves to browse the selection. A dual display was available for high-traffic stores, holding 576 packages of pantyhose. The display was eye-catching and immediately recognizable. Also memorable to customers was the L'eggs logo lettering which suggested baby chicks and egg shapes in the pair of "g" letters. The egg theme of the product package and the in-store presentation reinforced the feminine message.

=== Market forces ===
After Hanes showed the market promise of L'eggs packaging and distribution concepts, competition soon arose from established industry players and new challengers. L'eggs started selling their product in Safeway grocery stores in 1970, but in 1971 Safeway introduced a competing house brand of pantyhose. In 1972, L'eggs honored Safeway with the Golden Egg Award for helping to sell 10 million pairs of L'eggs pantyhose, even though Safeway was now a rival in the same product line. Safeway reported to their shareholders in 1973 that the Safeway pantyhose was far outselling L'eggs and all other pantyhose brands in their stores. French ballpoint pen company Bic entered the pantyhose market for the first time in 1974 with Fannyhose, an attempt to break into the L'eggs market segment. The product failed after a few years of struggling sales, costing Bic millions. Industry stalwart Kayser-Roth introduced in 1973 the No Nonsense brand of pantyhose to compete with L'eggs, and by 1978 they had retaken almost 10 percent of the market, compared to L'eggs' 15 percent. Burlington Industries had been losing money in their Activ pantyhose line which they shut down in 1974, then in late 1975 they introduced a new luxury pantyhose product designed by John Kloss, hoping the famous name would lend cachet. All of the North Carolina–based hosiery companies (L'eggs, Hanes, Burlington, Kayser-Roth) had by this time placed product lines in drug stores and supermarkets.

The product's slogan, "Our L'eggs fit your legs", appeared in print and TV ads. Famous figures were hired to promote the brand, including ice skater Peggy Fleming, dancer Juliet Prowse, actress Joyce DeWitt, singer Debby Boone and actress Barbara Eden. In 1979, a new slogan was revealed: "Nothing beats a great pair of L'eggs." Actress Jamie Lee Curtis signed an endorsement deal with L'eggs in 1996 and immediately insured her own legs for $1 million with Lloyd's of London. Singer Tina Turner represented Hanes' premium line of pantyhose at the same time that Curtis was spokesperson for L'eggs.

=== Home handicrafts and reuse ===
L'eggs published a book suggesting handicraft ideas.

The plastic eggs themselves were popular with customers. The customer could give the empty egg to their children as a toy, or they could use the egg in home handicrafts. L'eggs commissioned Sag Harbor artist and author Alexandra Eames to write The L'eggs Idea Book in 1976. Some 23,000 books were bought in the first month. The cover of the book showed a handful of craft examples including a faux Fabergé egg, a candle mold, and a planter for small houseplants. The plastic eggs were often decorated and used for Easter decoration, so L'eggs responded with "Easter L'eggs" in February–March 1975, selling eggs in five pastel colors: blue, pink, yellow, purple and green. In 1980, a group of Florida Southern Bell technicians known as the Telephone Pioneers created audible Easter eggs to allow blind children to enjoy the traditional Easter egg hunt. The eggs held different circuitry to make contrasting sounds including clicks, beeps and buzzing. A similar group in Southern California, the Pacific Bell Pioneers, followed suit in 1986. They fitted L'eggs eggs with a nine-volt battery and circuitry inside, padded with polyester fiber filling, and switched by an electric toggle on the outside.

Though the L'eggs egg was integral to the brand image, in 1991 Hanes ceased packaging the hosiery in plastic eggs as sustainable packaging became the industry norm; the package was redesigned into an egg-shaped cardboard form which is much more easily recycled.

The container was also used in part to make a prop for the Star Trek: The Next Generation science fiction television show episode "Arsenal of Freedom".

=== Pantyhose decline ===
Around 1991, pantyhose sales started dropping because office workers were adopting a more casual appearance, wearing slacks with knee-high hose rather than pantyhose.

The decline was industry-wide; L'eggs and Hanes continued to hold a dominant position in the dropping hosiery segment, reportedly capturing 50 percent of the market in 1992.

In 1994 after about an 18 percent drop in business, both L'eggs and Hanes reduced their workforce by 8,300 American employees, cutting their manufacturing capacity by 5 percent.

In mid-1996, sales of Hanes/L'eggs hosiery had dropped another 9 percent in the past year, and they closed a distribution center in Illinois. Responding to this market metamorphosis, L'eggs began emphasizing their higher-priced products, reaching out to the conservative market segments that were still requiring formal skirts, hose and heels in the office.

=== In the 21st century ===
In 2011, L'eggs aired a new advertising campaign – its first since 1996. A television commercial showed active young adults trying on different pairs and dancing in the street wearing L'eggs pantyhose. L'eggs intended the campaign to appeal to new, younger consumers. According to some industry analysts, the market had stabilized at a low level.

Hanesbrands would sell L'eggs to Westport, Connecticut-based private equity firm Windsong Global LLC in October 2023.

L'eggs would undergo its first major rebrand since its 1970 launch, adopting a new logo in October 2024.
