= Hanes =

American clothing brand

- Type: Brand
- Genre: Clothing
- Founded: July 26, 1900; 126 years ago (as Shamrock Knitting Mills)
- Founder: John Wesley Hanes
- Headquarters: Winston-Salem, North Carolina, U.S.
- Products: Underwear, casualwear, hosiery and socks
- Owner: Hanes, Inc.
- Parent: Hanesbrands
- Website: www.hanes.com

Hanes (founded in 1900) and Hanes Her Way (founded in 1985) is an American clothing brand headquartered in Winston-Salem. Founded in 1900 as Shamrock Knitting Mills by John Wesley Hanes, the company is owned by Hanesbrands Inc.

== History ==
Hanes was founded in 1900 by John Wesley Hanes (one of Winston-Salem's wealthiest and most influential businessmen) at Winston Salem, North Carolina, under the name Shamrock Knitting Mills.

He died of heart trouble in 1903. In 1911, Shamrock Knitting Mills built a new plant at 3rd and Marshall Streets; it was sold in 1926 and occupied by a Cadillac dealership after a larger plant was built on West 14th Street. Known as Shamrock Mills, the original building was listed on the National Register of Historic Places in 1978. Shamrock Knitting Mills was named Hanes Hosiery Mills Company in 1914.

John Wesley Hanes' brother Pleasant H. Hanes founded the P.H. Hanes Knitting Company in 1901. The brothers previously operated a tobacco manufacturing business, that they sold to R. J. Reynolds Tobacco Company in 1900. The P.H. Hanes Knitting Company merged with Hanes Hosiery in 1965. The P.H. Hanes Knitting Company complex was listed on the National Register of Historic Places in 2005. In 1965 the Hanes Corporation was formed from the consolidation of two Hanes companies: P. H. Hanes Knitting Company and Hanes Hosiery Mills Company In 1979, the corporation became part of Consolidated Foods (later renamed Sara Lee).

In September 2006, Sara Lee Corporation spun off its branded clothing Americas and Asia business as a separate company called Hanesbrands Inc., which designs, manufactures, sources and sells a broad range of clothing essentials. The company's portfolio of brands include Hanes (its largest brand), Champion (its second largest brand), Playtex (its third largest brand), Bali, Just My Size, Barely There, Wonderbra, L’eggs, C9 by Champion, Duofold, Beefy-T, Outer Banks, Sol y Oro, Rinbros, Zorba and Ritmo.

In 2016, Hanesbrands acquired Pacific Brands for US$800 million, adding the Bonds and Berlei brands to its portfolio, as well as the Sheridan luxury linen brand. In February 2018 the Hanes Australasia division also acquired the Bras N Things brand for an estimated AU$500 Million.

== Production ==
Hanes produces 82 million meters of fabric a year at its plants in El Salvador. In 2023, it made up 20% of the country's exports in the textile and clothing industry, and 9.8% of El Salvador's total exports. It has been manufacturing its products in El Salvador for 30 years and was the country's largest exporter from 2013 to 2024.

During the coronavirus pandemic in United States, Hanes retrofitted its factory to manufacture N95 masks for healthcare workers.

== Products ==
The Hanes brand is used by the company for marketing a variety of clothing:

- Innerwear
  - Women's underwear, such as bras, panties and bodywear
  - Men's underwear and undershirts
  - Kids’ underwear and undershirts
  - Socks
  - Hosiery
- Outerwear
  - Activewear, such as performance T-shirts and shorts
  - Casualwear, such as T-shirts, fleece and sport shirts

== Advertising ==
During the 1970s and 1980s, their women's hosiery tagline was "Gentlemen Prefer Hanes". In the early 1990s, the slogan was turned around as "The lady prefers Hanes".

During the mid-1980s, television advertisements featured actress Polly Rowles endorsing the brand as “Inspector 12” with her line “They don’t say Hanes until I say they say Hanes!”

From 1992 to 1999, the brand's main slogan was "Just wait'll we get our Hanes on you." The slogan was revived in 2005, with celebrity endorsements including Michael Jordan, Matthew Perry and Marisa Tomei, as "Look who we've got our Hanes on now."

In 1996, Hanes was a major sponsor of the Atlanta Olympics. They produced a unique series of only 500 Beefy T-shirts; the first shirt was auctioned for $32,500, the highest price paid for a shirt was $42,000.

In the 2000s, an ad campaign began for their Hanes "Go Tagless" T-shirt, featuring various celebrities including Jordan, Phillip Brooke, Big Ben Kennedy, Jackie Chan, and Brian Regan.

As of July 2008, Charlie Sheen joined Jordan as the next Hanes celebrity spokesman. The commercials (along with the previous Cuba Gooding, Jr. commercials) were created by writer Brett Baker and Art Director David McKay of The Martin Agency in Richmond, Virginia. Hanesbrands has ended its advertising campaign featuring Sheen because of domestic violence charges filed against the actor in 2010.

In 2019, the company introduced body positive messaging with the "Every Bod" campaign for their FlexFit boxers, aimed to reduce the macho image associated with men's underwear.
