= Timeline of Winston-Salem, North Carolina =

The following is a timeline of the history of the city of Winston-Salem, North Carolina, United States.

== Prior to 20th century ==
- 1753 – November 17: Moravian settlers establish Bethabara in present-day Winston-Salem, the first community in the Wachovia tract.
- 1766 – January 6: Work begins on Salem, planned as the administrative center of Wachovia.
- 1769 – Single Brothers' House completed in Salem.
- 1771 – June 7: First burial in Salem's Moravian cemetery, God's Acre.
- 1772 – School that became Salem Academy and Salem College opens in Salem.
- 1784 – Salem Tavern rebuilt after fire.
- 1822 – African and African-American Moravian congregation later known as St. Philips Moravian Church organized in Salem.
- 1840 – Salem Cotton Mill operating in Salem.
- 1843 – Salem Vigilant Fire Company established.
- 1849 – Salem becomes part of the newly formed Forsyth County.
- 1851 – New town "Winston" created as seat of Forsyth County.
- 1854 – Fayetteville and Western Plank Road completed to Forsyth County.
- 1856
  - December 13: Salem incorporated.
  - Western Sentinel newspaper begins publication in Winston.
- 1857 – Charles Brietz becomes first mayor of Salem.
- 1859
  - Winston incorporated.
  - William Barrow becomes first mayor of Winston.
- 1861
  - May 20: North Carolina secedes from the Union.
  - December 15: Brick church later known as St. Philips Moravian Church consecrated in Salem.
- 1866 – First National Bank of Salem established.
- 1870 – Hamilton Scales begins manufacturing plug tobacco on Liberty Street in Winston.
- 1872 – P. H. Hanes and Company organized to manufacture tobacco in Winston.
- 1873 – Piedmont Warehouse, Winston's first tobacco warehouse, established.
- 1875 – R. J. Reynolds builds his first tobacco factory in Winston.
- 1879 – Wachovia National Bank established in Winston.
- 1890 – Twin-City Daily Sentinel newspaper in publication.
- 1891 – First Catholic Mass held at St. Leo's original church site in the West End.
- 1892 – September 28: Slater Industrial Academy, a school for African Americans, founded.
- 1896 – Population: 5,500 in Salem; 13,500 in Winston.
- 1897 – The Journal newspaper begins publication.
- 1899 – United States Post Office Department merges the Winston and Salem post offices as the Winston-Salem Post Office.

== 20th century ==
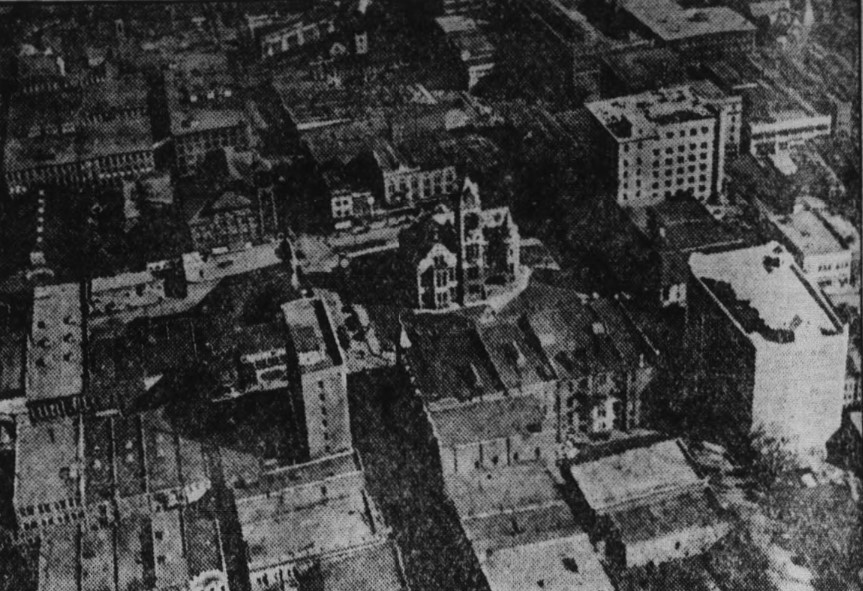
Downtown Winston-Salem in 1921

- 1905 – Professional baseball comes to Winston-Salem.
- 1912 – Winston-Salem Hebrew Congregation formed.
- 1913
  - May 13: Town of Salem and city of Winston merge to form Winston-Salem municipality.
  - Camel cigarettes introduced by R. J. Reynolds Tobacco Company.
- 1918 – November 17–18: Riot occurs after a mob gathers at the city jail amid lynching rumors.
- 1919 – October 14: Winston-Salem Foundation established with seed money from Col. Francis Henry Fries.
- 1923 – May 28: North Carolina Baptist Hospital opens.
- 1926
  - Nissen Building constructed.
  - June 1: Safe Bus Company begins offering transportation to African-American residents of Winston-Salem.
- 1927 – Miller Municipal Airport established.
- 1929 – April 23: Reynolds Building officially opens.
- 1930
  - WSJS radio begins broadcasting.
  - Shell-shaped Shell Service Station built.
- 1935 – State Theatre active.
- 1936 – Z. Smith Reynolds Foundation established in Winston-Salem.
- 1937
  - WAIR radio begins broadcasting.
  - Krispy Kreme donuts in business.
- 1943 – June 17: Tobacco workers at R. J. Reynolds begin a sit-down strike that leads to Local 22 labor and civil-rights activism.
- 1948 – Piedmont Airlines founded in Winston-Salem.
- 1949 – August 9: Arts Council of Winston-Salem and Forsyth County founded as the first locally established arts council in the United States.
- 1951 – Flamingo Drive-In cinema opens.
- 1952 – Temple Emanuel synagogue built.
- 1953 – WSJS-TV begins broadcasting.
- 1956
  - Wake Forest College's new Winston-Salem campus opens.
  - Southeastern Center for Contemporary Art founded by James G. Hanes.
- 1960
  - Population: 111,135; Winston-Salem exceeds 100,000 for the first time.
  - February 8: Carl Matthews begins sit-ins at downtown lunch counters; later protests by Winston-Salem State and Wake Forest students help lead to a desegregation agreement among local merchants.
- 1965
  - North Carolina School of the Arts opens in Winston-Salem.
  - Hanes Hosiery Mills Company and P. H. Hanes Knitting Company merge to form Hanes Corporation.
  - Museum of Early Southern Decorative Arts established.
  - Parkway Theatre opens.
- 1966 – Wachovia Building completed.
- 1967
  - Reynolda House Museum of American Art becomes the setting for a collection of American art.
  - November 3–5: Civil unrest follows the death of a Black man in police custody; the National Guard is called in and the city is placed under curfew.
- 1969 – Black Panther Party, Winston-Salem, North Carolina Chapter established.
- 1972 – Winston-Salem Transit Authority purchases the assets of the Safe Bus Company.
- 1975 – Hanes Mall opens.
- 1979
  - North Carolina Black Repertory Company founded by Larry Leon Hamlin.
  - WGNN-TV begins broadcasting.
- 1981 – Wake Forest University's Layton Field baseball park dedicated.
- 1982
  - Second Harvest Food Bank of Northwest North Carolina opens.
  - Southern Garden History Society founded in Winston-Salem.
  - RJR Plaza Building completed.
- 1989
  - National Black Theatre Festival held for the first time in Winston-Salem.
  - Lawrence Joel Veterans Memorial Coliseum opens.
  - May 5: Tornadoes strike Winston-Salem and Forsyth County as part of the May 1989 tornado outbreak.
- 1993 – Mel Watt becomes U.S. representative for North Carolina's 12th congressional district.
- 1995 – Wachovia Center completed.
- 1997
  - City website online by June.
  - Jack Cavanagh becomes mayor.
- 2000 – Sister city relationship established with Ungheni, Moldova.

== 21st century ==
- 2001
  - November: Allen Joines elected mayor.
  - July: Sister city relationship with Kumasi, Ghana, formalized.
  - WinstonNet, a community technology nonprofit, established.
- 2005 – Winston Cup Museum opens.
- 2006
  - September 5: Hanesbrands becomes an independent, publicly traded company after its spin-off from Sara Lee Corporation.
  - October 23: Sister city relationship with Nassau, Bahamas, formalized.
  - December 18: Sister city relationship with Yangpu District, Shanghai, formalized.
- 2008 – Wachovia acquired by Wells Fargo.
- 2010
  - BB&T Ballpark opens as home of the Winston-Salem Dash.
  - Population: 229,617.
- 2011
  - February 21: Winston-Salem City Council considers a resolution establishing a sister-city partnership with Buchanan, Liberia.
  - Winston-Salem Open tennis tournament begins at Wake Forest University.
- 2012 – Wake Forest Biotech Place opens in converted R. J. Reynolds Tobacco Company buildings downtown.
- 2013 – Piedmont Triad Research Park renamed Wake Forest Innovation Quarter.
- 2014 – Alma Adams becomes U.S. representative for North Carolina's 12th congressional district.
- 2016 – Kaleideum formed by the merger of the Children's Museum of Winston-Salem and SciWorks.
- 2019
  - March 12: Confederate Dead Monument removed from the former Forsyth County Courthouse property.
  - December 6: BB&T and SunTrust Banks complete merger of equals to form Truist Financial, headquartered in Charlotte, North Carolina.
- 2020
  - October 9: Atrium Health and Wake Forest Baptist Health combine as a single enterprise.
  - Population: 249,545.
- 2022 – January 31: Fire at the Winston Weaver Company fertilizer plant on North Cherry Street prompts evacuation within a one-mile radius because of explosion risk from ammonium nitrate.
- 2023 – December 16: Winston Cup Museum closes to the public.
- 2024 – February 17: Kaleideum opens its new downtown museum.
- 2025 – December 1: Gildan completes acquisition of Hanesbrands.

== See also ==
- History of Winston-Salem
- List of mayors of Winston-Salem, North Carolina
- History of Forsyth County
- National Register of Historic Places listings in Forsyth County, North Carolina
- Timelines of other cities in North Carolina: Asheville, Charlotte, Durham, Fayetteville, Greensboro, Raleigh, and Wilmington

== Bibliography ==
- "Forsyth County". Branson's North Carolina Business Directory. Raleigh, N.C.: Levi Branson. 1896.
- Walsh's Winston-Salem, North Carolina, City Directory. Charleston, S.C.: W. H. Walsh Directory Co. 1904.
  - Walsh's Winston-Salem, North Carolina, City Directory. Charleston, S.C.: W. H. Walsh Directory Co. 1908 – via Internet Archive.
- "Winston-Salem". The Automobile Blue Book. Vol. 6. Class Journal Company. 1919.
- Federal Writers’ Project (1939). "Winston-Salem". North Carolina: A Guide to the Old North State. American Guide Series. Chapel Hill: University of North Carolina Press. p. 258 – via Internet Archive.
- Nergal, Ory Mazar, ed. (1980). "Winston-Salem, NC". Encyclopedia of American Cities. New York: E. P. Dutton. OL 4120668M.
- Tursi, Frank (1994). Winston-Salem: A History. Winston-Salem, N.C.: John F. Blair. ISBN 978-0-89587-115-2.
