= Littleton Holland =

American silversmith (1770–1846)

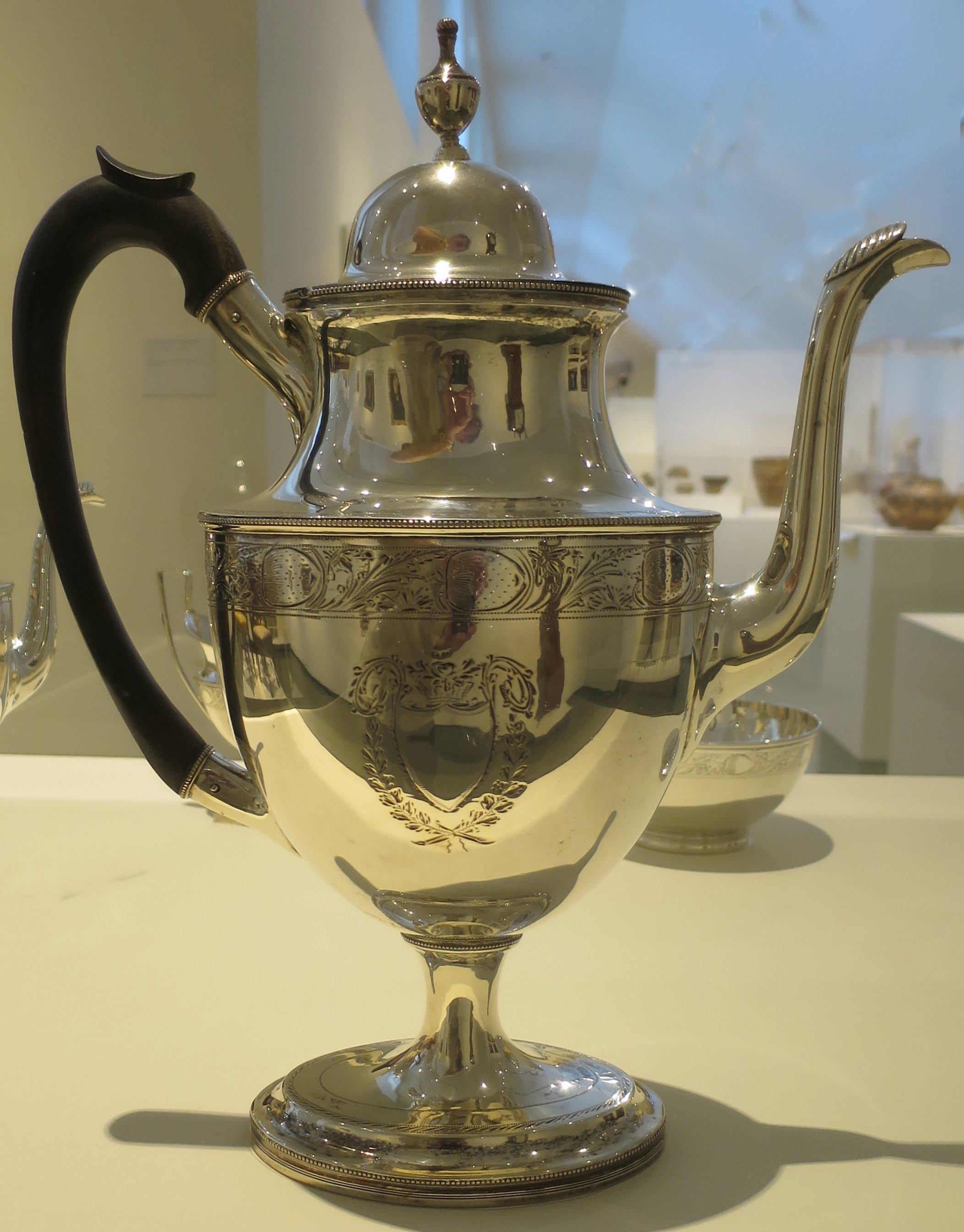
Coffee pot from coffee and tea service by Littleton Holland, c. 1800–05

Littleton Holland (January 20, 1770 – April 14, 1846) was an American silversmith, active in Baltimore, Maryland. His works are held in the collections of the Baltimore Museum of Art, the Honolulu Museum of Art, the Museum of Early Southern Decorative Arts, and the Yale University Art Gallery.

== Biography ==
Littleton Holland was born on born on January 20, 1770 in Freetown, Bristol County, Massachusetts. He married Hester Ringgold, daughter of William Ringgold of Kent County, Maryland.

Holland first appears in the 1802 Baltimore Directory as a jeweler located at 122 Baltimore Street, with Peter Little (1775–1830), a clockmaker and watchmaker, listed at the same address from 1799 to 1814. Holland was listed in the city directories on Baltimore Street until 1822. By 1833, he had relocated to 13 St. Paul's Street. He died on April 14, 1846, in Baltimore.

== Sources ==
- "Sugar Basket by Littleton Holland", Museum of Early Southern Decorative Arts.
- Silver in Maryland: Catalogue and Exhibition, Jennifer Faulds Goldsborough, Museum and Library of Maryland History, Maryland Historical Society, 1983, page 43.
- American Silversmiths and Their Marks, Volume 3, Stephen Guernsey Cook Ensko, 1927, pages 73, 186.
- Kovels' American Silver Marks, Ralph M. Kovel, Crown Publishers, 1989, page 185.
- The Baltimore Directory and Register, for 1814-15 ..., James Lakin, J.C. O'Reilly, 1814, page 106.
- "Littleton Holland", Sterling Flatware Fashions.
- "A 12 1/2 inch ladle by Littleton Holland, Baltimore", Old South Silver.
- Three Centuries of Historic Silver: Loan Exhibitions Under the Auspices of the Pennsylvania Society of the Colonial Dames of America, Mrs. Alfred Coxe Prime, Society, 1938, page 12.
