= Johann Gottlob Krause =

American stonemason (1760–1802)

- Born: September 18, 1760; Bethabara, Province of North Carolina
- Died: November 4, 1802 (aged 42); Bethabara, North Carolina, U.S.

Johann Gottlob Krause (September 18, 1760 – November 4, 1802) was an American master mason. He built several notable buildings in the Moravian community in today's Old Salem, North Carolina.

== Early life ==
Krause was born in Bethabara, Province of North Carolina, in 1760, to German parents Matthias Krause and Christina Böhner. He was orphaned by the age of two, and was adopted by Gottfried Aust, Salem's master potter, and Felicitas Grosch. Krause ran away from home in 1773, but returned to become Aust's apprentice the following year. Their conflict continued, however, and the town moved Krause to the Single Brothers' House.

== Career ==
In 1781, Krause studied masonry under Brother Melchior Rasp, an immigrant from Salzburg, Austria. Rasp, who was 67 at the time, was blind in one eye and unwell. After an eighteen-month apprenticeship, Krause became a journeyman and worked beside Rasp until Rasp's death in 1785.

Krause founded the Salem brickyard in 1783, from which he sourced his material for the planned Single Sisters' House; however, a fire burned Salem Tavern, and the bricks were instead used on its reconstruction. The tavern became the first two-storey, all-brick structure in the town. Krause's bricks were 12 inches long, 5.5 inches wide and 3 inches tall, which required two hands to handle and set them. Four days after the tavern was completed, the town bestowed Krause as a master mason at the age of 24. George Washington stayed at the tavern on the night of May 31, 1791, during his southern tour.

In 1786, with the post-Revolutionary War building boom beginning to fade, Krause had planned to return to Bethabara as a potter, but he was persuaded to stay in Salem. He did eventually follow through with his plan. He returned to Salem in 1793 to assist with the building of the Boys' School. He learned several new techniques from William Craig, a non-Moravian workman.

=== Selected works ===
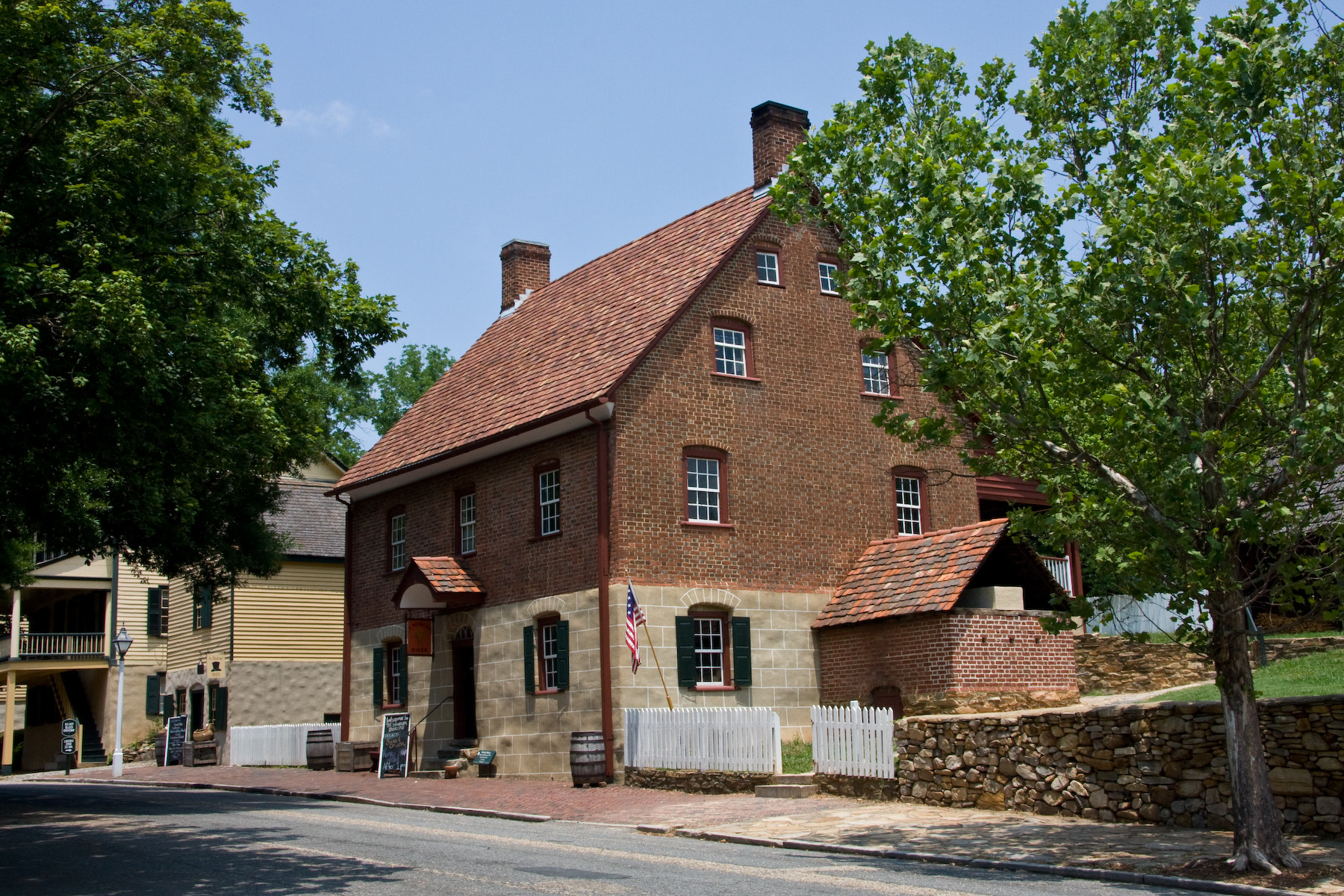
Butner Bakery (later C. Winkler Bakery), constructed in 1799

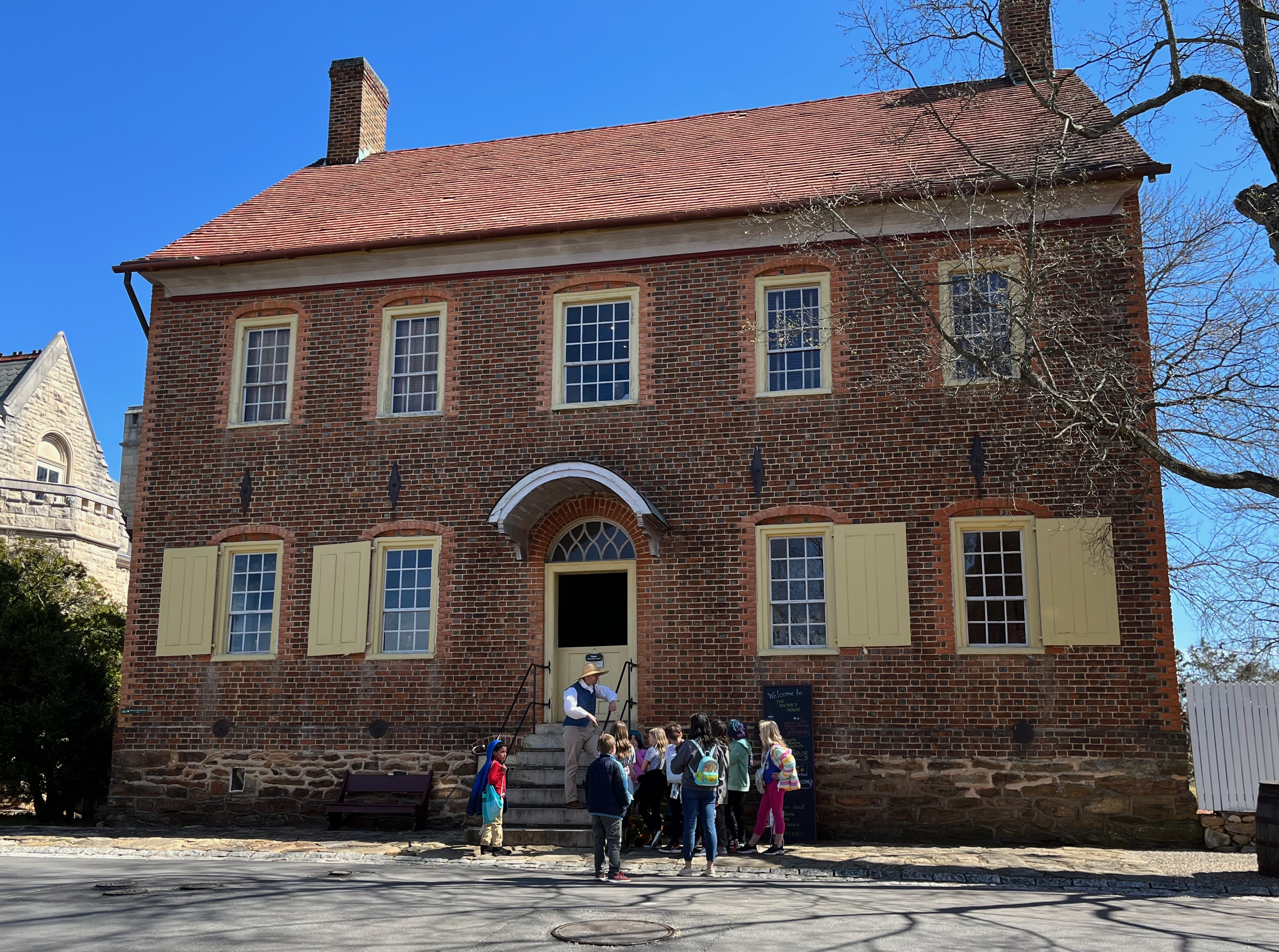
Dr. Samuel Vierling House (1802)

Krause was responsible for the construction of the following buildings:

- Salem Tavern (1784)
- Gottlieb Shober House (1785)
- Single Sisters' House (1785), where his sister, Anna Johanna, lived
- Single Brothers' House (expansion; 1786)
- Salem Boys' School (1794) – brick and roof tiles
- Christopher Vogler House and Workshop (1797)
- Thomas Butner Bakery (1799)
- Home Moravian Church (1799)
- Dr. Samuel Vierling House (1802)

== Personal life ==
He married twice, firstly in 1786 to Maria Magdalena Meyer (who died in 1791, five years into their marriage), then to Christina Boeckel. He had eight children between the two marriages.

In 1788, he was accused (without substantiation) of having taken meat from the smokehouse of the tavern. Early the following year, he purchased the Bethabara pottery. He lived there for the rest of his life.

What is now known as the Johann Gottlob Krause House (or the Potter's House), on Bethabara Road, was restored in 1973.

== Death ==
Krause died in 1802, aged 42. He is interred in God's Acre Moravian Cemetery in Old Salem, North Carolina. Both of his wives are also buried there; Christina survived him by 44 years.
