= The Coffee Pot (Winston-Salem, North Carolina) =

Landmark in Winston Salem, North Carolina, United States

Coordinates: 36.090823°N 80.242837°W

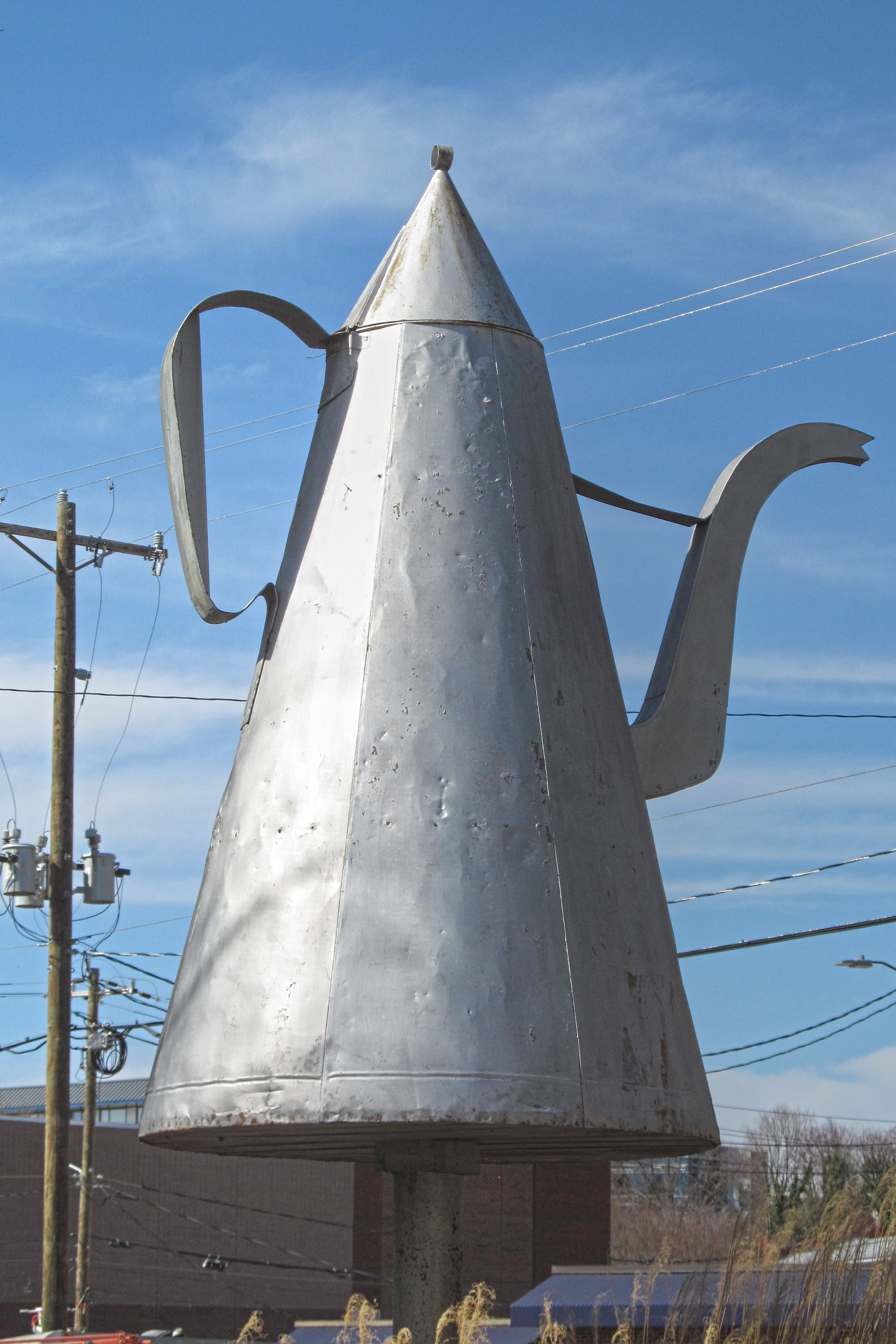
The Coffee Pot in Winston-Salem

The Mickey Coffee Pot is a large tin coffee pot which is a local landmark in Winston-Salem, Forsyth County, North Carolina. The coffee pot was created in 1858 by tinsmiths Julius and Samuel Mickey as an advertisement for their tin shop on South Main Street. The pot is considered to be a symbol of hospitality and an unofficial symbol of the city.

The pot's original location on the curb caused it to be hit by wagons and cars. After the pot was damaged by a car in 1920, city officials attempted to keep the sign from being restored, as it was considered a safety hazard and illegal advertising. However, after local protest, the coffee pot was restored on a post farther from the street.

The pot was relocated in 1959 when then Interstate 40 (now US 421/"Salem Parkway") went through the shop's location and again when Old Salem Road was created in the 1960s and the roads were reconfigured. The structure of the Coffee Pot is owned by the City of Winston-Salem. It is located at the north end of Old Salem in a traffic island formed by Old Salem Road and Main Street.
