= Frank L. Horton =

American antiques dealer and museum director (1918–2004)

- Born: Frank Liipfert Horton; March 21, 1918; Raleigh, North Carolina, US
- Died: February 21, 2004 (aged 85)
- Education: Pace University (DNG)
- Occupations: Antiques dealer, museum director, curator
- Known for: Founder and director of the Museum of Early Southern Decorative Arts (MESDA)

Frank Liipfert Horton (March 21, 1918 – February 21, 2004) was an American antiques dealer and founder-director of the Museum of Early Southern Decorative Arts (MESDA) in Winston-Salem, North Carolina, in 1965. He oversaw the restoration and reconstruction of fifty buildings in the Old Salem and Bethabara historic districts of Winston-Salem from 1950 to 1972.

== Biography ==
Horton was born in Raleigh, North Carolina, in 1918 to Theodosia Horton Taliaferro and physician Miles Horton. He was raised in Winston-Salem and graduated from Reynolds High School in 1935. He attended the Augusta Military Academy and the New Mexico Military Institute and studied business at Pace Institute, though he left after one year and never earned his degree.

During the 1930s, Horton and his mother started an antiques business. The business never flourished financially, but it enabled him to travel around the country and gain expertise and connections in the antiques market. During World War II, he enlisted in the United States Navy in 1942 and served aboard the USS Sturtevant on convoy escort duty in the North Atlantic Ocean.

When Old Salem Inc. was established in 1950, Horton became the museum's first director of restoration. In this capacity, he supervised the reconstruction and restoration of approximately fifty historic buildings in the Old Salem and Bethabara historic districts (historically settled by Moravian immigrants) between 1950 and 1972.

In 1965, Horton and his mother founded the Museum of Early Southern Decorative Arts (MESDA), part of Old Salem, which collected and exhibited furniture, textiles, silver, paintings, ceramics, and architectural interiors from the American South created prior to 1820. He drew on his and his mother's personal collection of Southern decorative arts to furnish the museum and personally funded many of the museum's building projects and most of its acquisitions. He retired as museum director in 1988.

Horton received an award from the American Association for State and Local History in 1965, the Louise du Pont Crowninshield Award from the National Trust for Historic Preservation in 1970, the Henry Francis du Pont Award from the Winterthur Museum, Garden and Library in 1989, an honorary doctorate of humanities from Wake Forest University in 1995, and the North Carolina Award in Fine Arts in 1999. In 1997, Old Salem named its new museum complex the Frank L. Horton Museum Center.

Horton died on February 21, 2004, at the age of 85, after suffering from Parkinson's disease for many years. He never married and had no children.
