= Samuel Vierling =

German physician (1765–1817)

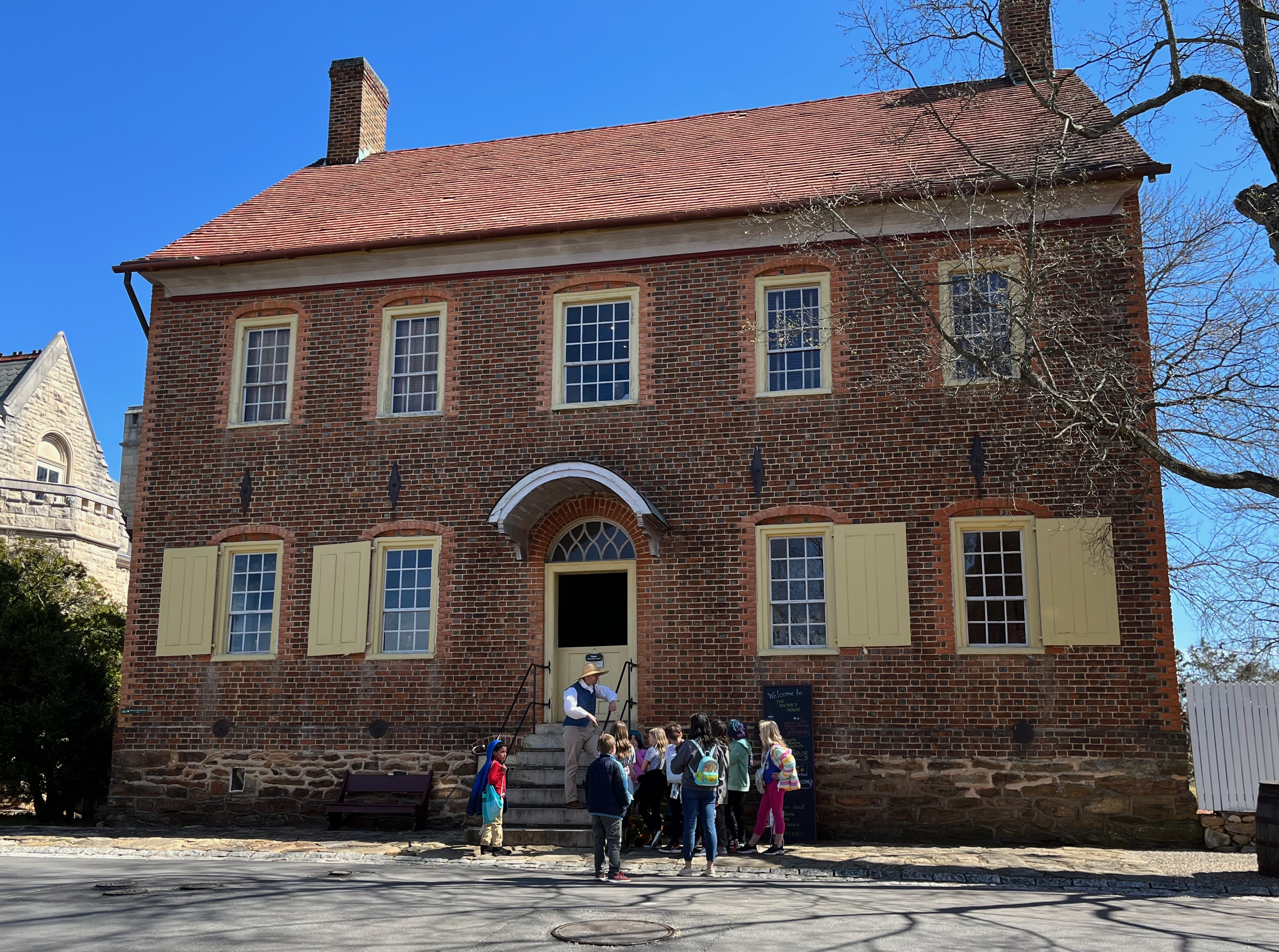
- The Dr. Samuel Vierling House
- Born: 5 June 1765; Rudolstadt, Silesia
- Died: 15 November 1817 (aged 52); Old Salem, North Carolina, U.S.
- Resting place: Salem Moravian God's Acre; Old Salem, North Carolina, U.S.
- Occupation: Physician
- Spouse(s): Anne Elizabeth Bagge (1790–1792; her death); Martha Elizabeth Miksch (1792–1817; his death)

Samuel Benjamin Vierling (5 June 1765 – 15 November 1817) was an 18th- and 19th-century German physician. He was eminent in today's Old Salem, North Carolina.

== Life and career ==
Vierling was born in 1765 in Rudolstadt, Silesia, to George Ernest Vierling and Maria Rosina Klein.

He studied medicine at the University of Berlin. In 1789, he was invited to become the physician of the Moravian community in the Wachovia Tract, in North Carolina, which was established around twenty years earlier. He was received into the Moravian church by the congregation of Zeist, Netherlands, in September 1789, then sailed to American shores the following month. He lived firstly in Bethlehem, Pennsylvania, then moved south to North Carolina the following February. On his first day in today's Old Salem, in which he was living in the First House, he saved the life of Magdelena Kraus due to his knowledge of obstetrics.

He set up an apothecary and grew herbs to assist in his profession.

In 1790, he married Anne Elizabeth Bagge, daughter of Traugott and Rachel Bagge. She died two years into their marriage, aged 22, of scarlet fever. They had one child together: daughter Maria Rosina.

Vierling remarried, the same year, to Martha Elizabeth Miksch, step-granddaughter of bishop Augustus Gottlieb Spangenberg. They had three sons (August Ernst, Friedrich Benjamin and Theophilus) and five daughters (Henriette Friederika, Carolina Juliana, Johanna Eleonora, Theodora Amalia and Eliza Wilhemina).

In 1802, Vierling had a home built, by Johann Gottlob Krause, on Church Street in Salem. It was large enough to contain his medical practice, in which he undertook major operations such as brain surgeries. It was also Krause's final project, for he died the same year.

In 1805, he used Edward Jenner's cowpox vaccine to treat over two hundred people in Salem.

Vierling sang in the Home Moravian Church choir; he also played violin.

== Death ==
Vierling died in 1817, aged 52, after succumbing to typhoid. He was interred in Salem Moravian God's Acre in Old Salem, North Carolina, alongside his first wife. Martha, his widow, survived him by 27 years. She was also buried beside Vierling.

His home is known today as the Dr. Samuel Vierling House. It was restored by Old Salem, Inc., in 1980.
