= Salem Square =

Square in Old Salem, North Carolina

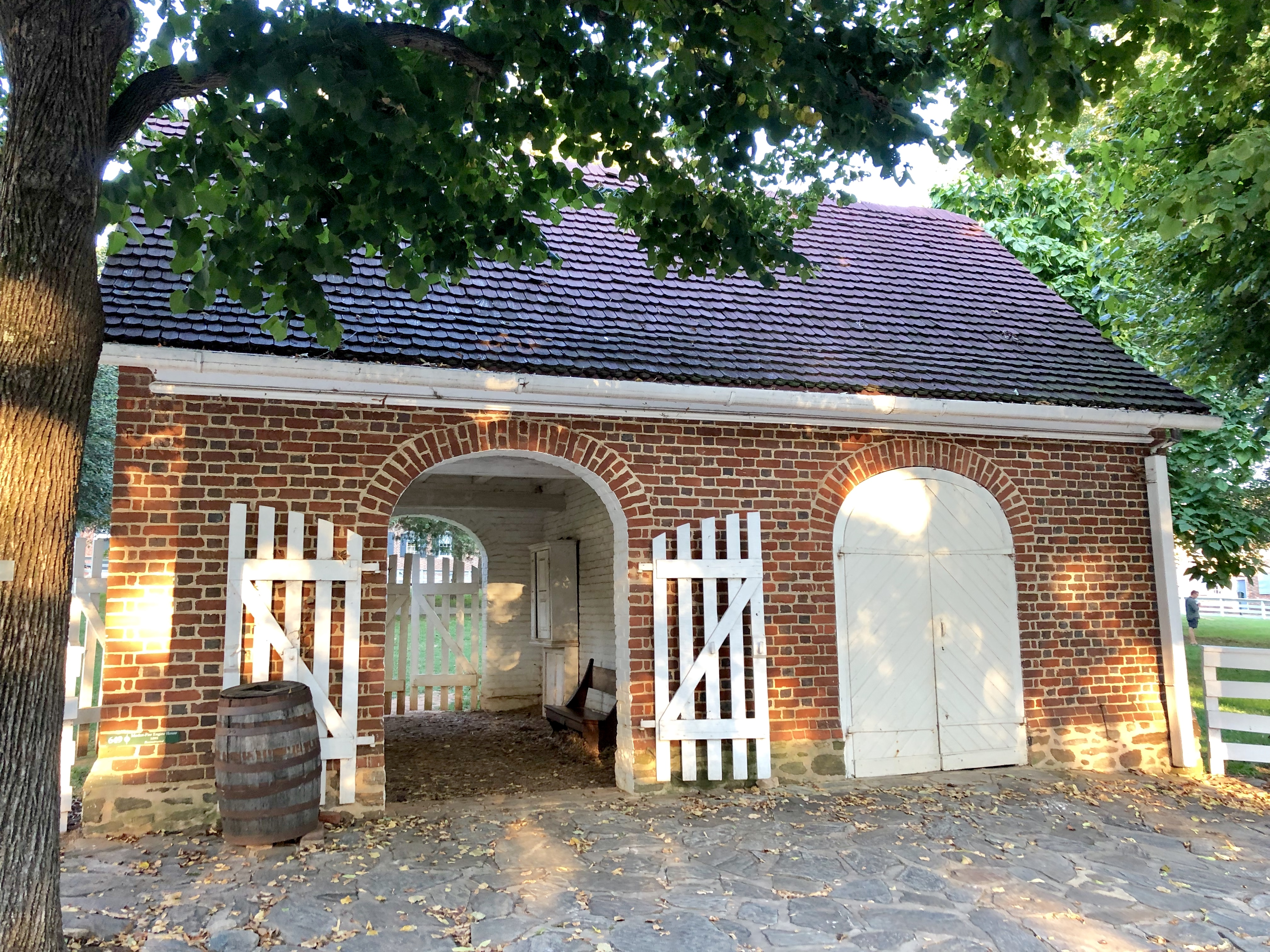
- The Market-Fire House, which stands on the square's western side, is a National Historic Landmark
- Location: Old Salem, North Carolina, U.S.
- Coordinates: 36.0871375°N 80.241619°W
- North: East Academy Street
- East: South Church Street
- South: West Street
- West: South Main Street

Construction
- Completion: 1733 (292 years ago)

Salem Square is a grass-covered public square in Old Salem, North Carolina, United States. It dates to the time of the settlement's founding, in 1766, by the Moravian community. It was designed by Friedrich von Marschall.

The square is bounded on the north by East Academy Street, on the east by South Church Street, on the south by West Street and on the west by South Main Street. Salem College and the Single Sisters' House overlook it from South Church Street, while the Market-Fire House, a National Historic Landmark, stands on its western edge. It was built after Dr. Samuel Benjamin Vierling began encouraged Salem residents to eat more fresh meat, instead of the salted version. Fresh meat began to be delivered to the Market-Fire House on a weekly basis.

On the square's southwestern corner stands a reconstruction of one of the water pumps that served the town from 1778.

Several events take place in the square each year, including a long-running band concert series in the summer.

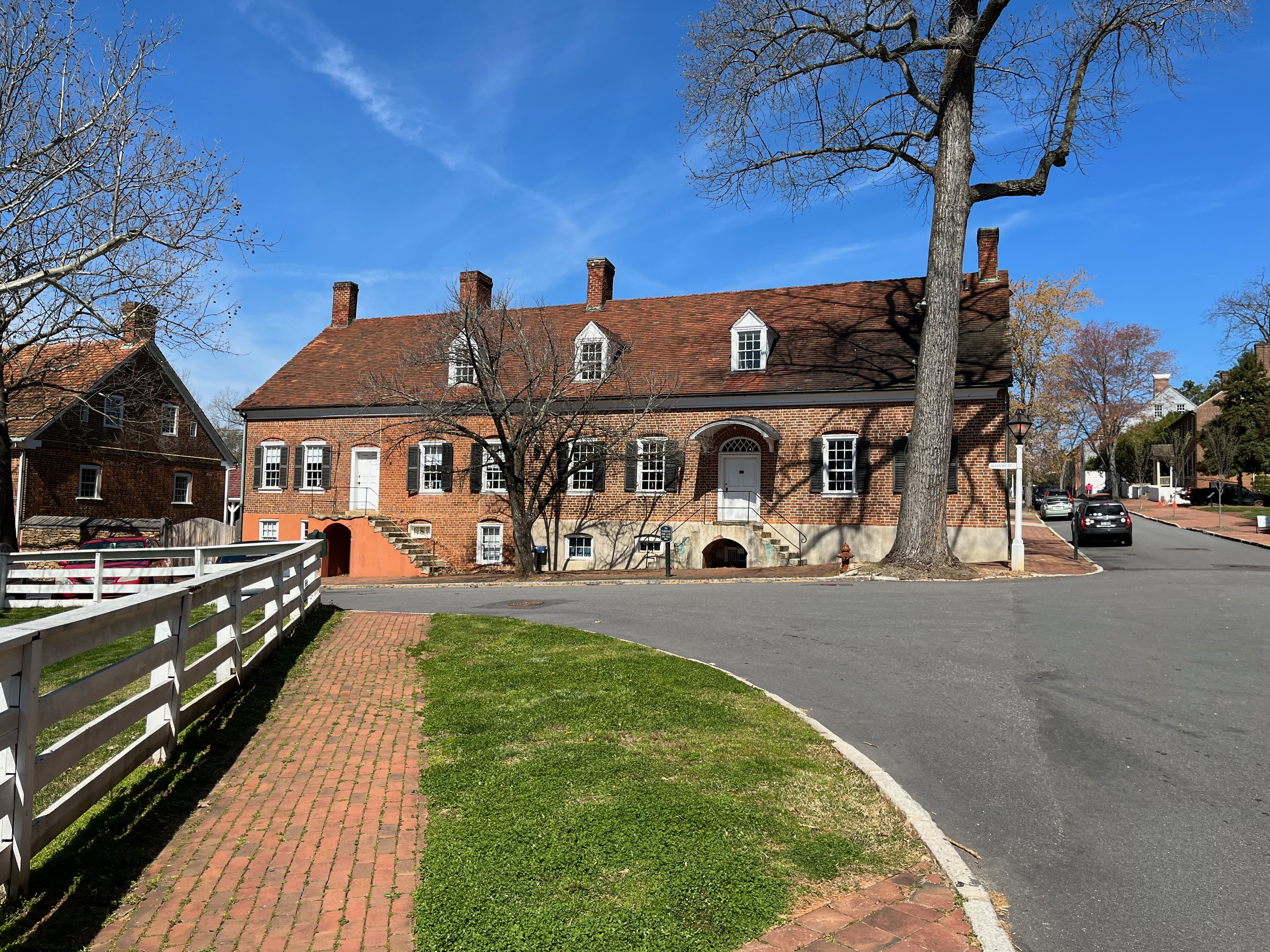
The Inspectors' House stands across from the northeastern corner of the square, at East Academy and South Church streets

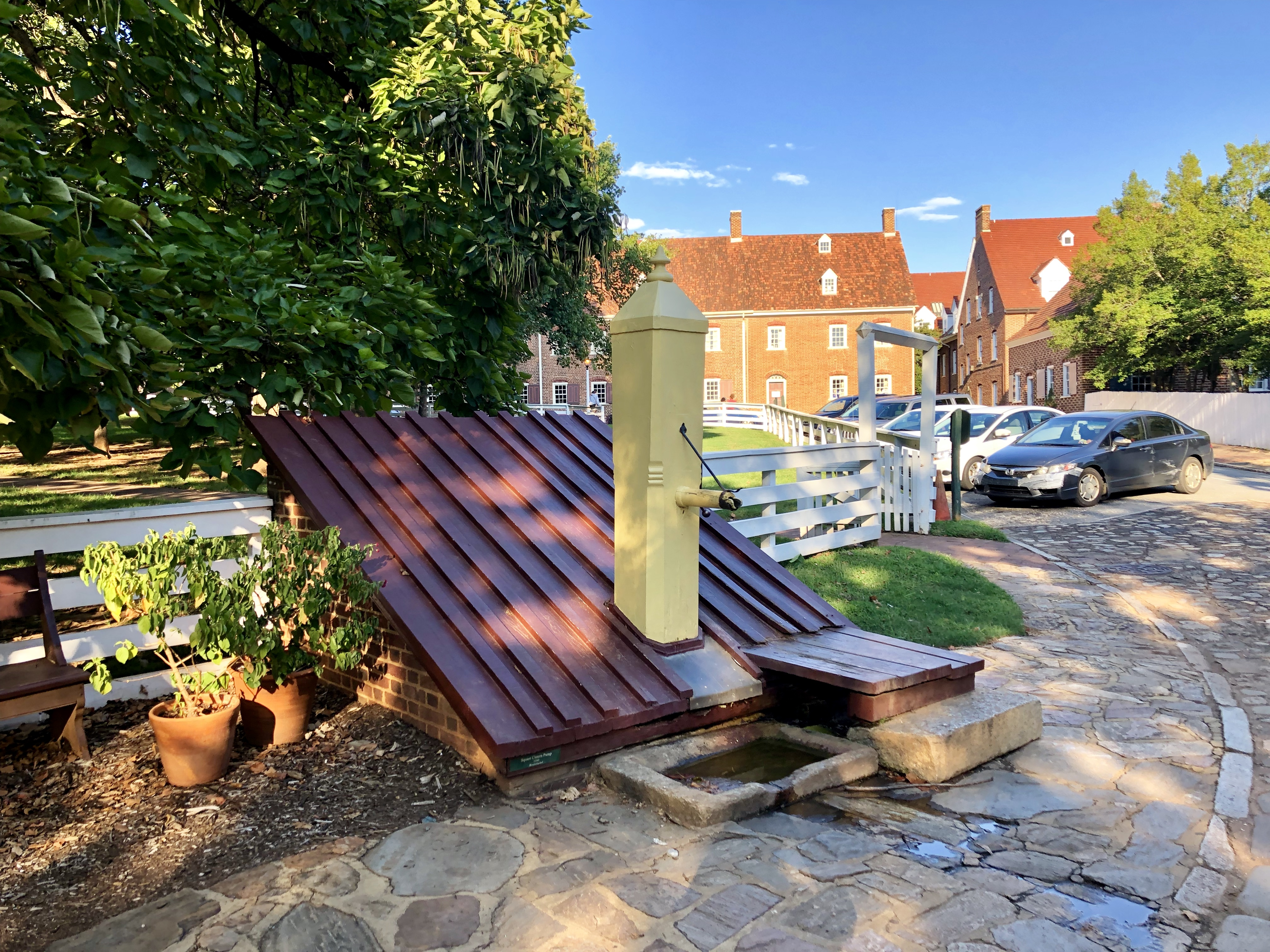
The water pump that stands at the southwestern corner of the square
