= Christian Winkler =

Swiss baker (1766–1839)

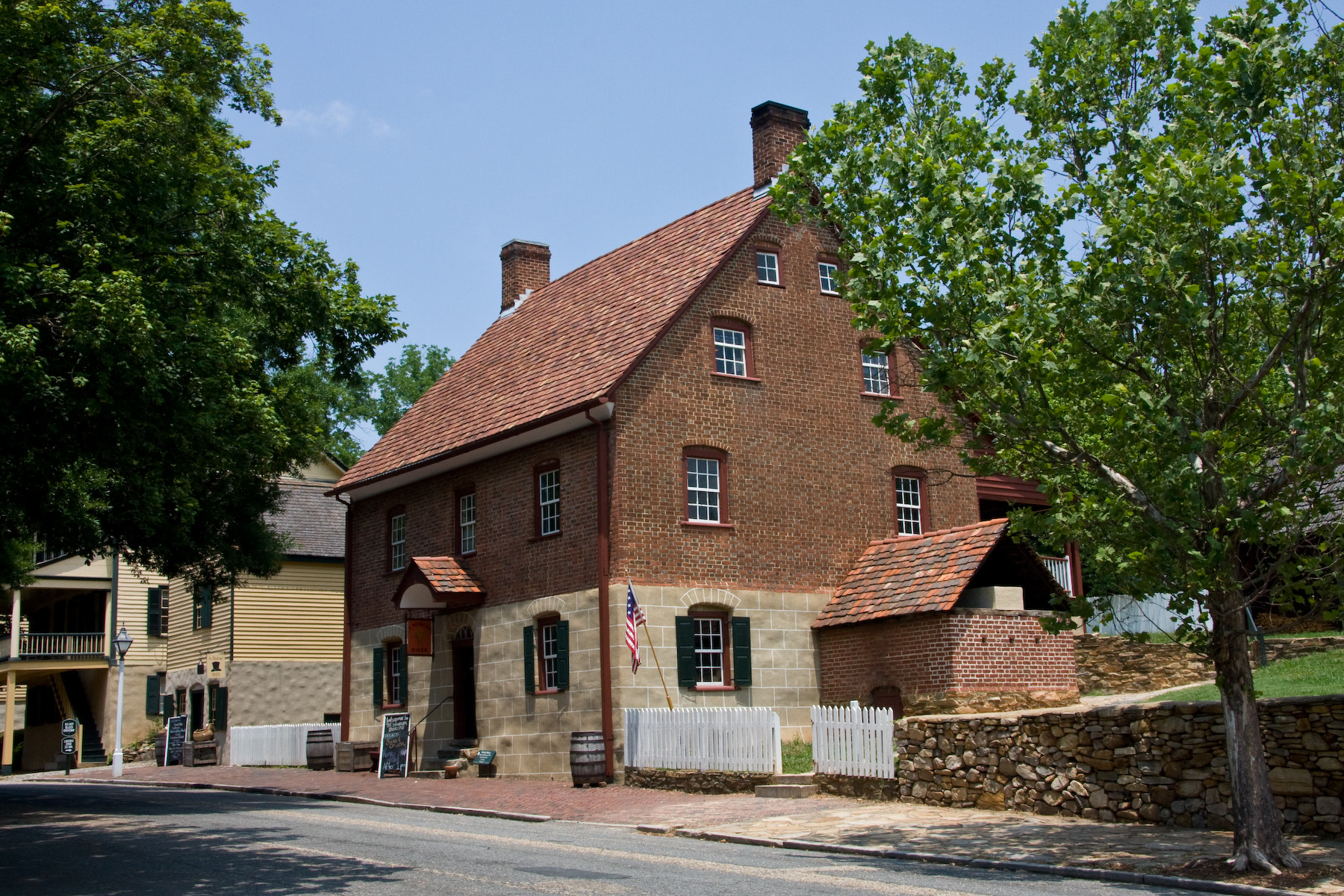
- C. Winkler Bakery in 2008
- Born: 16 September 1766; Blumenstein, Switzerland
- Died: 11 January 1839 (aged 72); Old Salem, North Carolina
- Resting place: God's Acre Cemetery
- Occupation: Baker
- Years active: 1807–1839

Christian Winkler (16 September 1766 – 11 January 1839) was a Swiss-born baker for whom C. Winkler Bakery, in Old Salem, North Carolina, is now named.

== Early life ==
Winkler was born in Blumenstein, Switzerland, in 1766. By 1792, he had joined the Moravian congregation of Neuwied, Germany. Sailing from Hamburg, he emigrated to the United States around the turn of the 19th century, initially to Nazareth, Pennsylvania.

In 1807, the year of his marriage, he was brought in by the Moravian Church community in Old Salem, North Carolina, to become their baker, replacing Thomas Butner Jr.

== Personal life ==
His wife was Pennsylvania native Elizabeth Dantz (possibly Danz). The couple had six children: Carl, Christian Jr., William, Matilda, Ludwig and Henrietta.

== Death ==
Winkler died in 1839, after a long illness, aged 72. He was interred in Salem Moravian God's Acre. His wife preceded him in death by three years. Winkler's son, William, continued the bakery. William's son, Charles, succeeded him. After Charles's death in 1893, his wife, Alice, took over until 1915.
