= C. Winkler Bakery =

Bakery in Winston-Salem, North Carolina

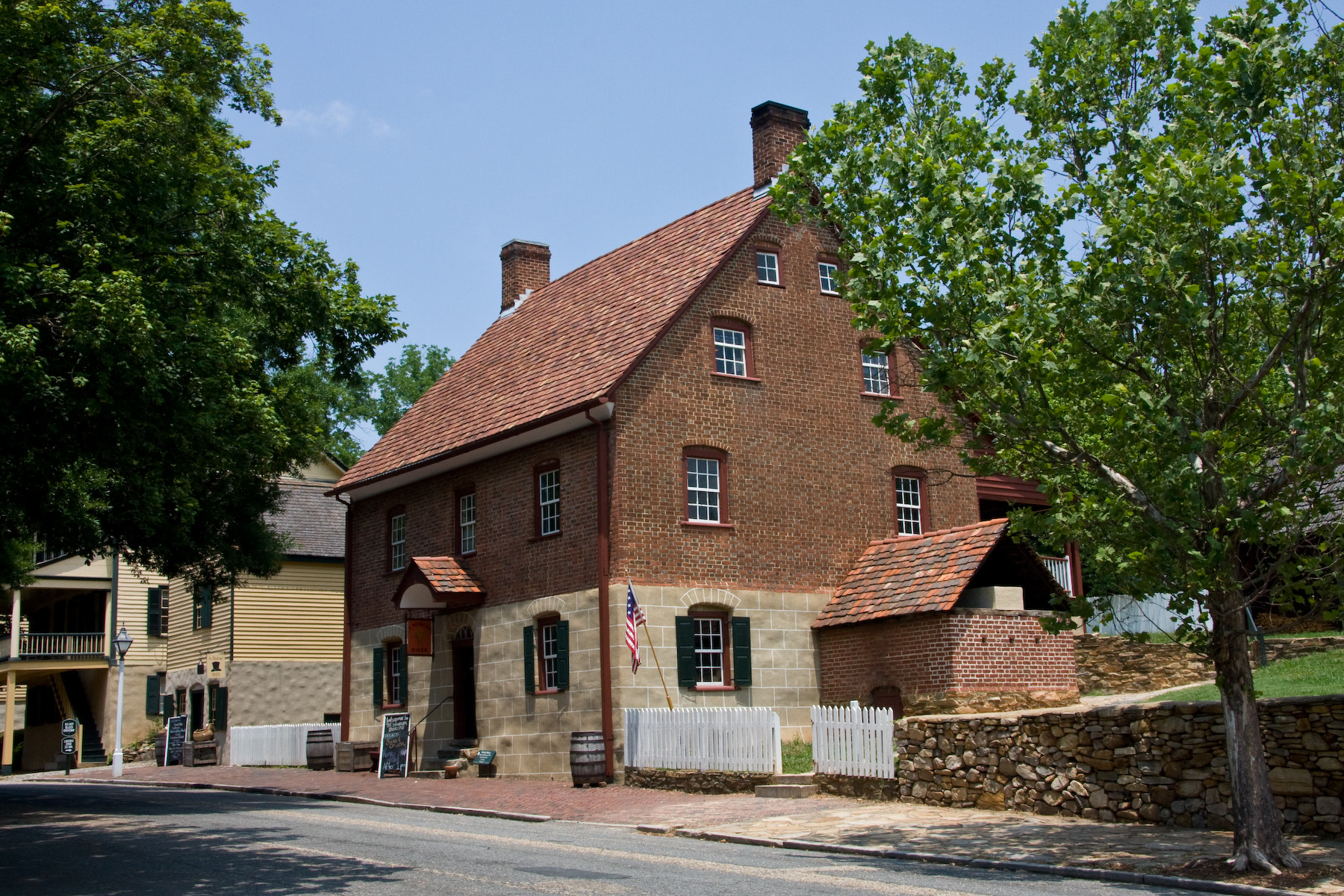
- The building in 2008
- Interactive map of C. Winkler Bakery

Restaurant information
- Established: 1799 (227 years ago)
- Owners: Old Salem Museum and Gardens
- Previous owner: Christian Winkler
- Location: South Main Street, Old Salem, North Carolina, U.S.
- Coordinates: 36.0881°N 80.2420°W

C. Winkler Bakery is a bakery on South Main Street in Old Salem, North Carolina. Now the oldest continually operating bakery in the state, it was established in 1799 by the Moravian Church. It is named for Christian Winkler, a Swiss-born baker who began working there in 1807, after replacing original baker Thomas Butner Jr. The building, which now has a landmark designation, was constructed by Salem's master builder and mason Johann Gottlob Krause, shortly before his death. Its first story is built of uncut stone; the upper levels, of hand-made brick.

Winkler and his third wife, Elizabeth, lived in the building with their six children. Their descendants subsequently lived in the property, including Winkler's grandson, Charles, and his wife, Alice, who ran the bakery in the late 19th century. They added a front porch and second-floor balcony. Bessie and Robert Spaugh, Alice's daughter and son-in-law, took over in 1913. They operated it until 1926, when it was sold outwith the family.

During the 1930s and 1940s, the property was a tea room and a coffee house, while the upper floors became apartments. After World War II, the first floor was an antiques store, then a knitting store and a sewing shop.

The bakery, which was restored to its original appearance in 1968, has been owned since 1963 by Old Salem Museum and Gardens. The workers arrive before dawn each day to start up the oven, which is fueled by wood, as it was originally. By around 7.30 am, the fire has normally faded, with the oven's bricks fully heated. The oven temperature at that point is around 700 °F (371 °C), but has to be left to cool to around 400 °F (204 °C).

Winkler Book and Gift Store opened on the second floor of the building in April 2023.

A commercial kitchen was established off-site to accommodate the volume of the bakery's sales. Moravian sugar cake is the bakery's most popular item.

== Personnel ==
Terry Ramsbotham is the bakery manager. Bobby James was the head baker in the early 21st century, assisted by Jeffrey Sherrill.

== See also ==
- List of bakeries
