= Salem Tavern =

Historic building in North Carolina, US

- U.S. National Register of Historic Places
- U.S. National Historic Landmark
- U.S. National Historic Landmark District – Contributing property
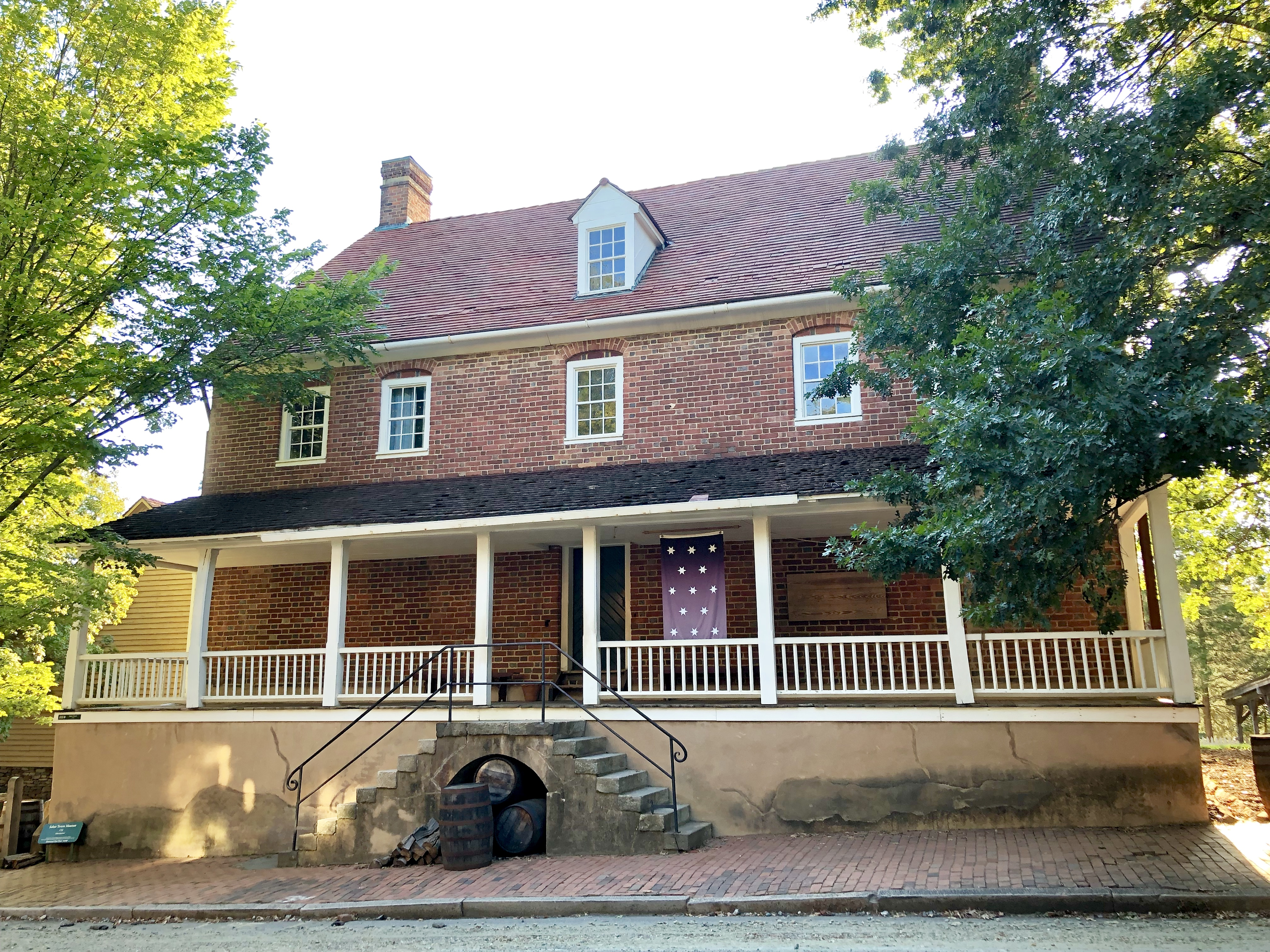
- 1784 Salem Tavern, September 2019

- Location within North Carolina Location within the United States
- Interactive map showing the location of Salem Tavern
- Location: 800 S. Main St., Winston-Salem, North Carolina
- Coordinates: 36°5′7″N 80°14′31″W
- Area: less than one acre
- Built: 1784
- Part of: Old Salem Historic District (ID66000591)
- NRHP reference No.: 66000592

Significant dates
- Added to NRHP: October 15, 1966
- Designated NHL: January 29, 1964
- Designated NHLDCP: November 13, 1966

Salem Tavern is a historic museum property at 800 South Main Street in the Old Salem Historic District in Winston-Salem, Forsyth County, North Carolina. It was a tavern in the 18th-century town of Salem, which is now part of Winston-Salem. The tavern is owned by Old Salem Museums & Gardens and open as an Old Salem tour building to visitors. Built in 1784 and enlarged in 1815, it was the first entirely brick building in what is now Old Salem, and is one of the oldest surviving brick tavern buildings in the United States. It was declared a National Historic Landmark in 1964.

== Description ==
The Salem Tavern is located on the west side of South Main Street, between Blum and East Walnut Streets. It consists of two separate buildings, one brick and one wood frame. Both are 2 1/2 stories in height, and have gabled roofs. The brick building is set on a raised foundation, with a single-story shed-roof porch extending across the front, supported by square posts and accessed from the sidewalk by side-facing stairs. The front portion of the building houses public rooms on the ground floor, and sleeping quarters for guests above, with the kitchen and landlord's quarters in an ell to the rear. The adjacent wood-frame building housed additional sleeping quarters.

== History ==
Constructed on the foundations of an earlier 1771 Tavern which burnt to the ground in 1784, the Salem Tavern was quickly rebuilt, because it formed an important function in the Moravian Church community which was a trade town. Constructed by mason Johann Gottlob Krause, using bricks already on hand for another building, the Tavern reopened quickly. The Tavern complex was later expanded by the construction of a wooden building to the north in 1815, then a building connecting the two was constructed in 1832. A two-story porch was run across the three buildings in 1838, but has since been removed. The Tavern was the lodgings for George Washington for two nights during his Southern Tour in 1791.

The Tavern and adjacent 1815 building have been restored to their original appearances. The restoration of the Salem Tavern was spearheaded by Winston-Salem native Ada Allen, an interior architect and designer, who lived in the building with her sister Annie. It was the first building restored in what would become Old Salem.

== Gallery ==
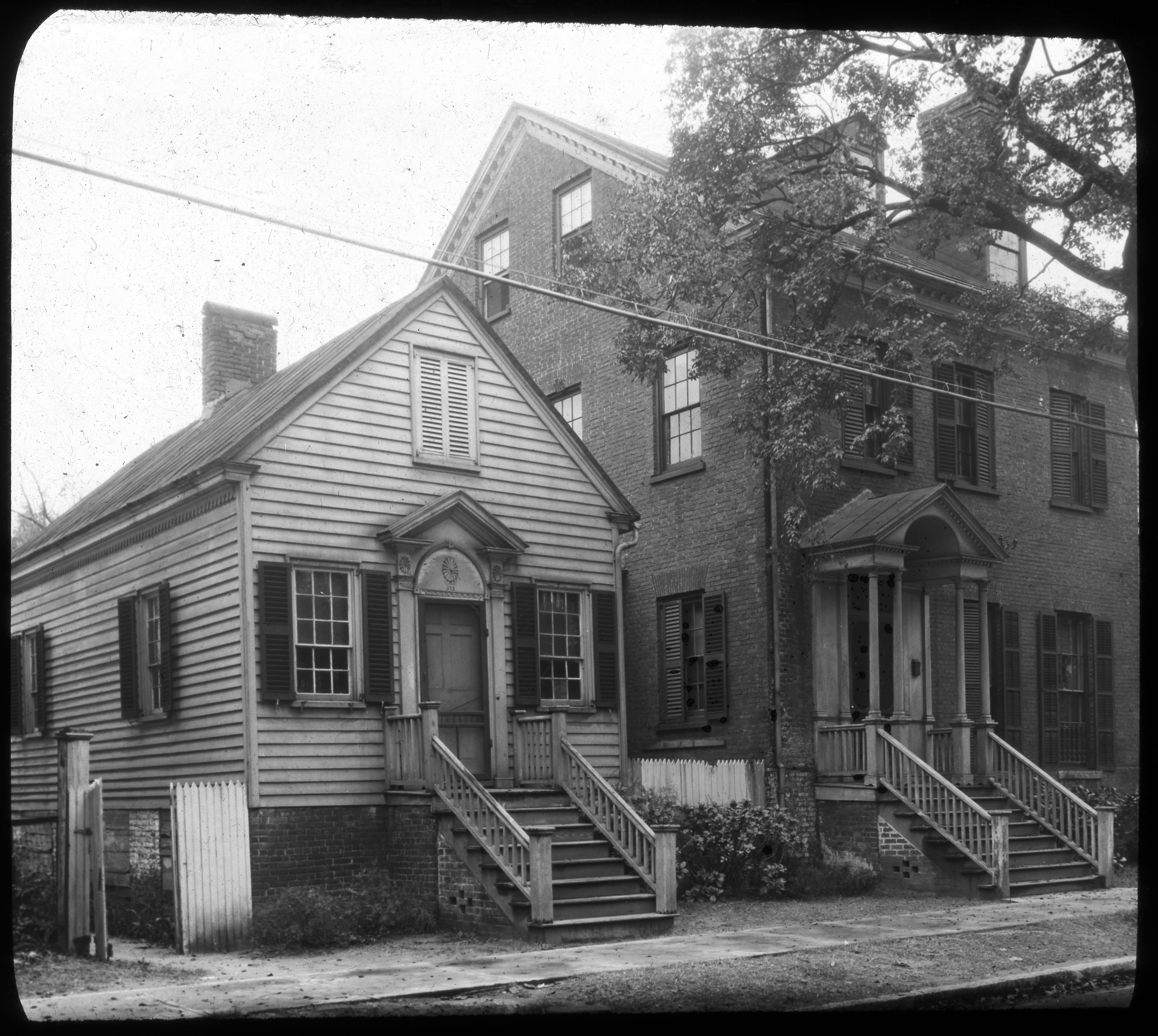
Salem Tavern, lantern slide c. 1930

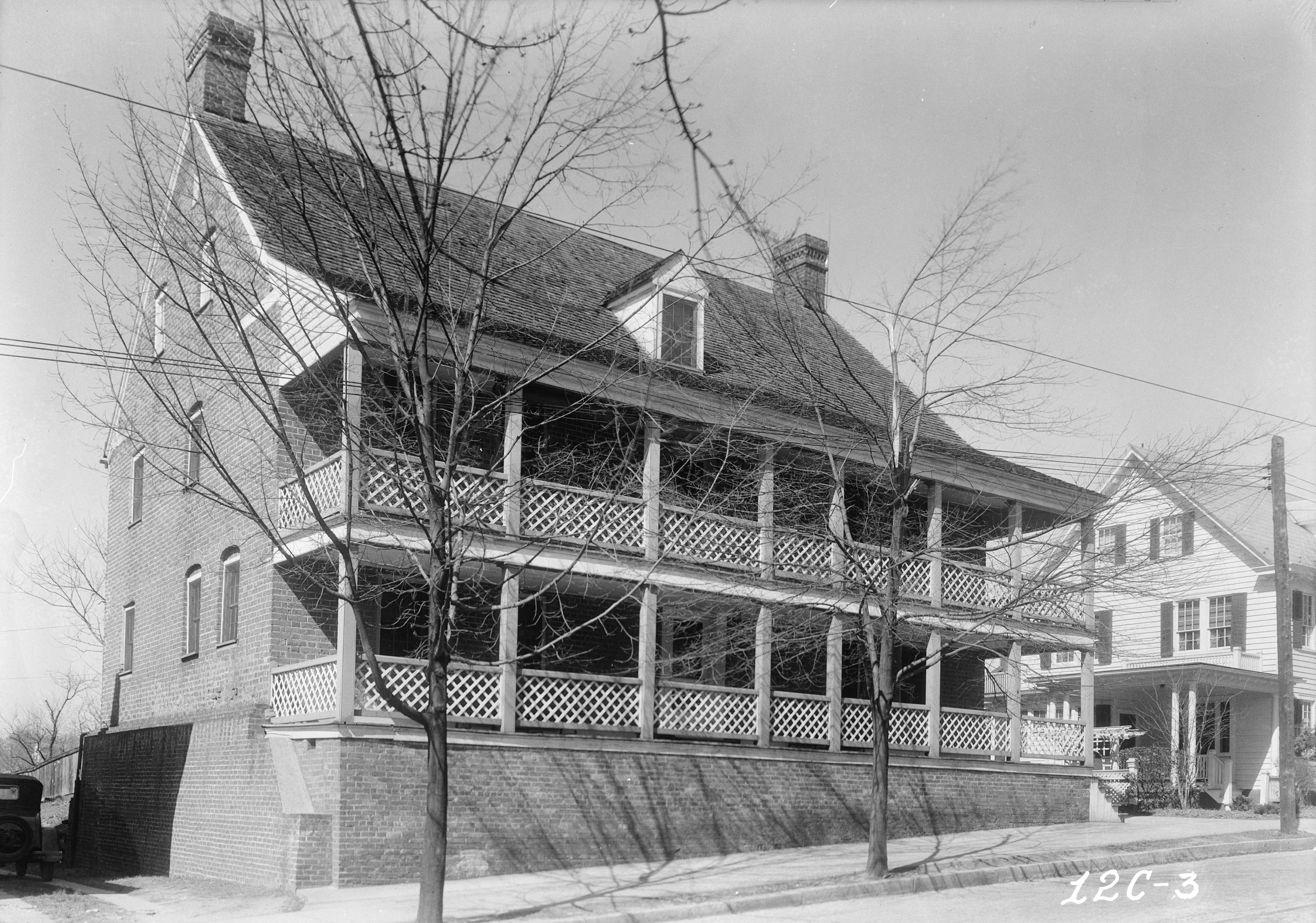
The Tavern, HABS Photo, 1934

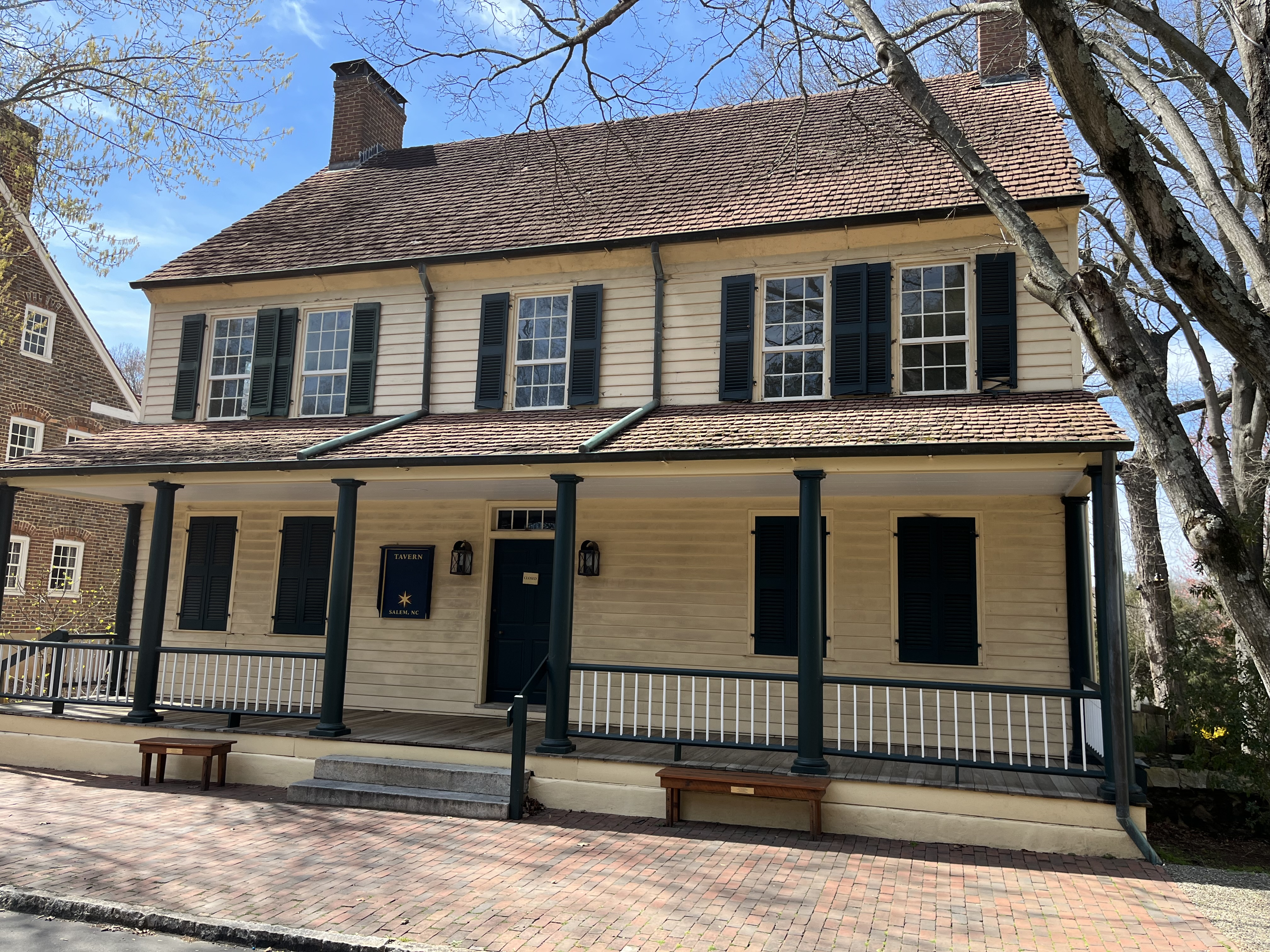
1815 Salem Tavern, September 2019

== See also ==
- List of National Historic Landmarks in North Carolina
- National Register of Historic Places listings in Forsyth County, North Carolina

== Sources ==
- Old Salem: The Official Guidebook. Penelope Niven and Cornelia Wright. Old Salem Inc.: Winston-Salem, NC. 2000.
