= St. Philips Moravian Church =

Historic church in North Carolina, United States

- U.S. National Register of Historic Places
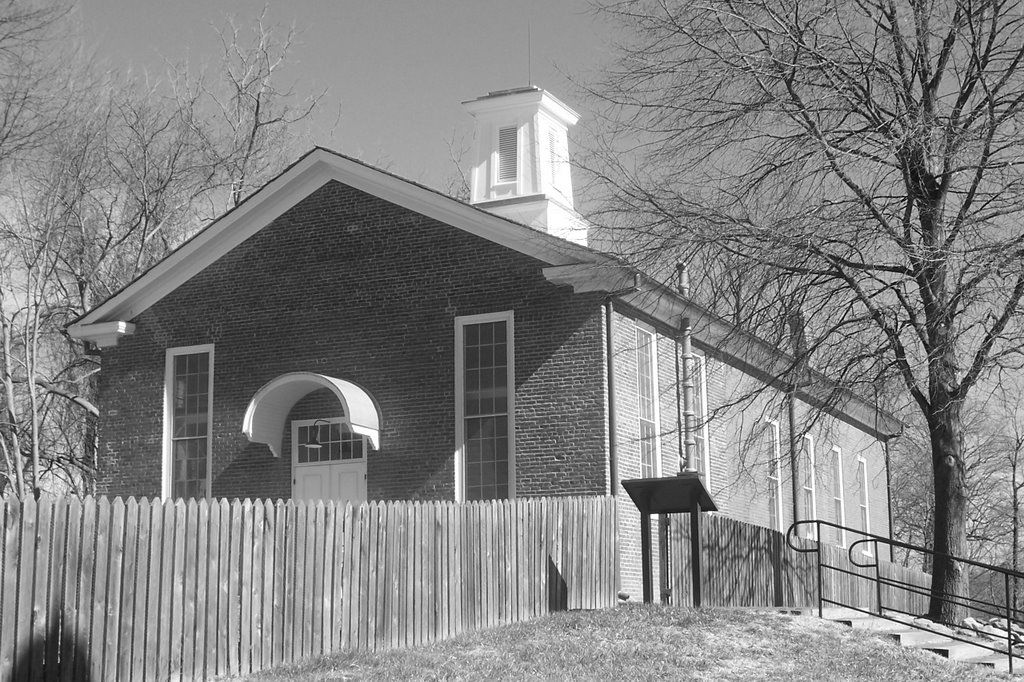
- St. Phillips Moravian Church, 2007

- Location within North Carolina Location within the United States
- Location: E side, S. Church St. near Race St., Old Salem, North Carolina
- Coordinates: 36°5′4″N 80°14′27″W
- Area: less than one acre
- Built: 1861
- Built by: Charles Houser; George Swink
- Architectural style: Greek Revival
- NRHP reference No.: 91001170
- Added to NRHP: September 3, 1991

St. Philips Moravian Church is the oldest surviving African American church building in North Carolina. The Moravian church was built in 1861 on the east side of South Church Street, near Race Street, in Old Salem, North Carolina. St. Philips was enlarged in 1890 and remained in continuous use until 1952. In 2004 it was restored by Old Salem Museums & Gardens for use as an interpreted building. Currently only worship services are held at the church weekly.

== History ==
Members of a local black congregation, newly formed in 1822, built a log church south of the 1773 'Strangers Graveyard', which had been designated as an African American cemetery in 1816. Between 1827 and 1831, a Sunday school was taught by white Single Sisters, until a state law forbade teaching literacy to slaves.

Moravian leaders built a larger brick church to the east of the graveyard in 1861. On May 21, 1865, Rev. Seth G. Clark, 10th Regiment, Ohio Cavalry read General Orders 32, announcing freedom from the St. Philips pulpit. In 1890, an extension consisting of a central hall with a classroom on each side of the lower level and a large room above (which opened onto the sanctuary and could be closed off and used as a classroom) was added to the front of the building.

The brick church was referred to as the Moravian "Negro congregation" until December 1913, when at a lovefeast service it was given the name St. Philips by Bishop Edward Rondthaler. The church building was added to the National Register of Historic Places in 1991. The adjacent 1823 log church was reconstructed on its original site in 1999.
