= Old Salem =

Historic district in North Carolina, United States

Coordinates: 36.0872°N 80.2422°W

- Old Salem Historic District
- U.S. National Register of Historic Places
- U.S. National Historic Landmark District
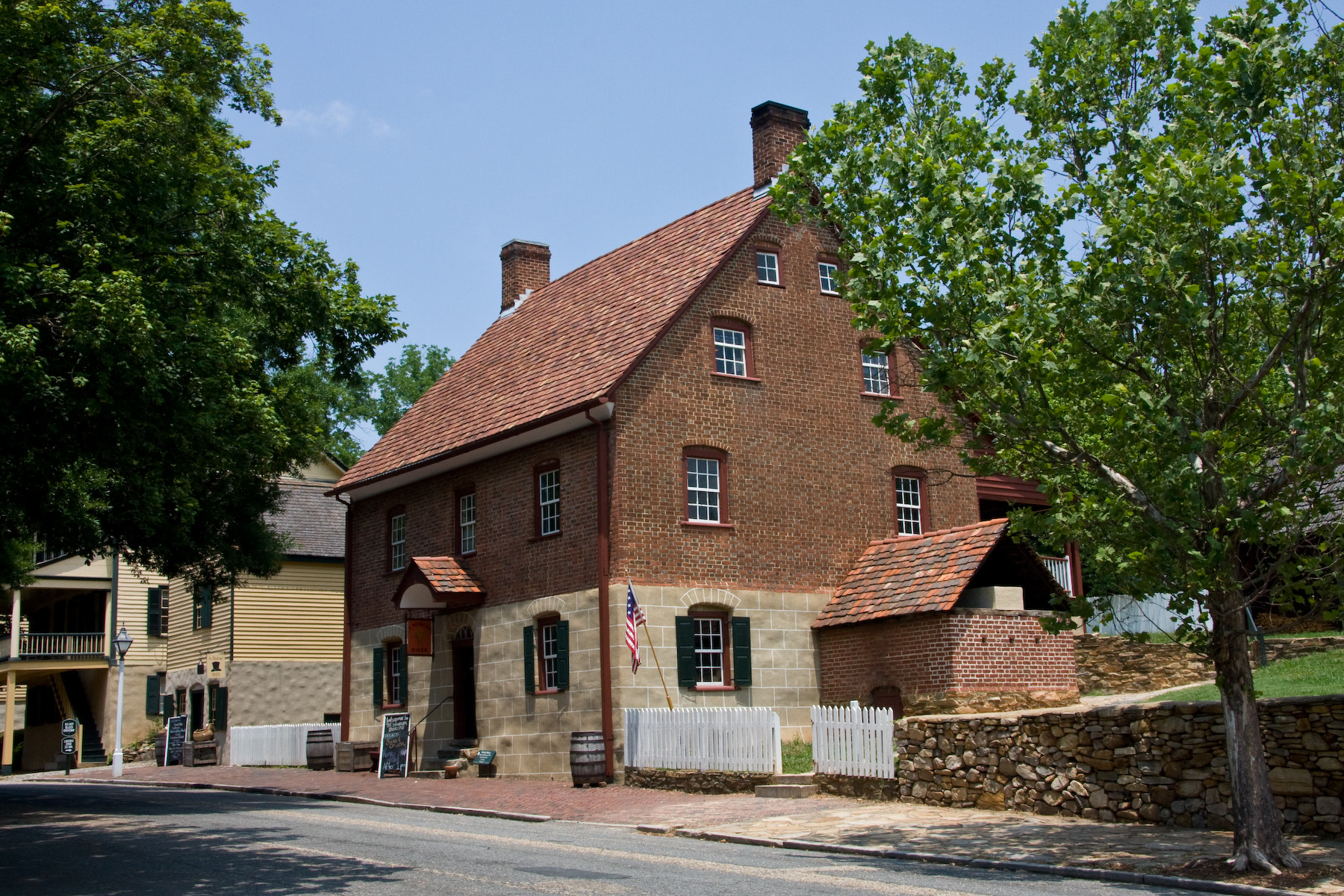
- Winkler Bakery at Old Salem

- Location within North Carolina Location within the United States
- Location: Between Race Street, Old Salem Road, Horse Street and Brookstone Avenue and including parts of God's Acre and buildings along the east side of Church Street, in Winston-Salem, North Carolina
- Built: 1766
- Architectural style: Germanic in early years, slowly shows English/American influence (i.e., Federal and Greek Revival period architecture)
- NRHP reference No.: 66000591

Significant dates
- Added to NRHP: November 13, 1966
- Designated NHLD: November 13, 1966

Old Salem is a historic district of Winston-Salem, North Carolina, United States, which was originally settled by the Moravian community in 1766. It features a living-history museum which interprets the restored Moravian community. The non-profit organization began its work in 1950, although some private residents had restored buildings earlier. As the Old Salem Historic District, it was declared a National Historic Landmark (NHL) in 1966, and expanded fifty years later. The district showcases the culture of the Moravian settlement in the Province of North Carolina during the colonial 18th century and post-statehood 19th century via its communal buildings, churches, houses and shops.

Two buildings are individually designated as NHLs: the Salem Tavern and the Single Brothers' House. Additional buildings and properties have been added to the National Register to expand the historic area (see St. Philips Moravian Church below, Single Brothers Industrial Complex Site and West Salem Historic District). Ownership of the buildings and land is divided among Old Salem, Inc., Wachovia Historical Society, private owners, Salem College, Salem Academy and Salem Congregation (the successor to the Salem Congregational Council, to whom all ownership of Church properties was transferred).

== Historic Salem ==
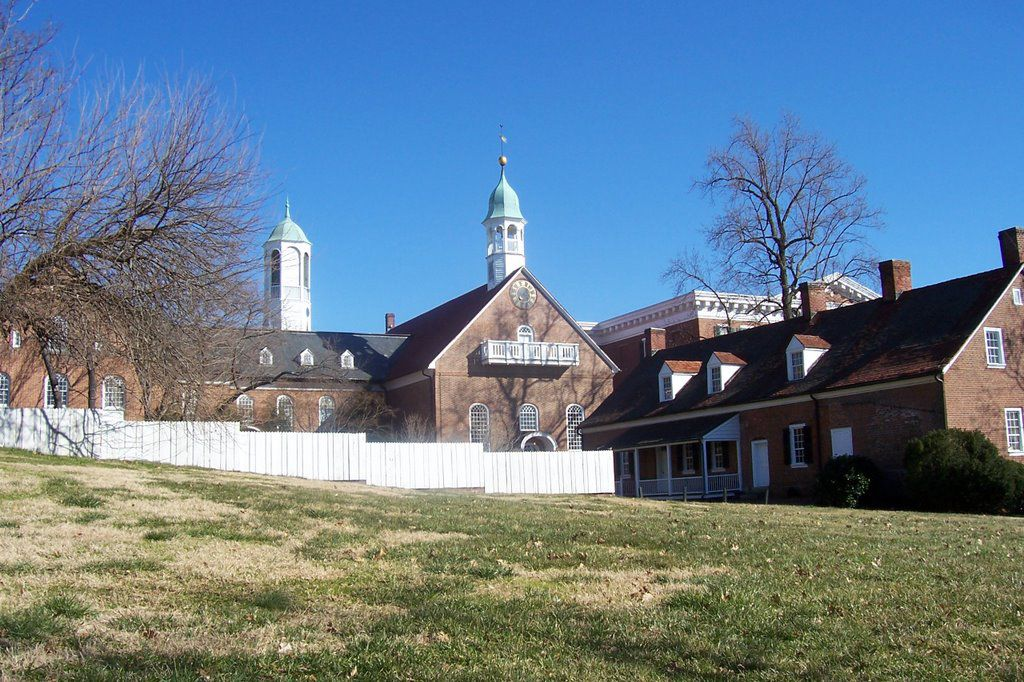
Home Moravian Church, 2007

Salem was originally settled by members of the Moravian Church, a Protestant denomination that first began in 1457, out of the followers of Jan Hus (1369–1415) in the Kingdom of Bohemia and Moravia, now part of the Czech Republic. In 1722, the German-speaking exiles finally found protection on the estate of Count Zinzendorf, a Saxon nobleman, where he allowed them to create the village of Herrnhut as their home. First settling in North America in Savannah, Province of Georgia, in 1735, they moved in 1740 to the Province of Pennsylvania, where they founded several communities (Bethlehem, Nazareth and Lititz). Because of development pressures, they looked for more space to create their church communities. Purchasing just over 98,985 acres (400.58 km^{2}) from John Carteret, 2nd Earl Granville, one of the British lords proprietor, in the Piedmont of the Province of North Carolina in 1753, they sent groups from Bethlehem to begin construction. They founded the transitional settlement of Bethabara (translated as "House of Passage," the first planned Moravian community in North Carolina in 1753, in Bethania), in 1759.

Salem was to be the central town of a tract of land named Wachovia. Construction began in 1766 to build the central economic, religious and administrative center of the tract. The outlying communities, eventually five in all (Bethabara, Bethania, Friedberg, Friedland and Hope), were more rural and agriculture focused. Salem and most of the other communities were controlled by the church, which owned all property and only leased land for construction. The worldwide Moravian Church initially owned the property, but Salem Congregation purchased the 5 square miles (13 km^{2}) town lot outright in 1826. All people in the communities had to be members of the church and could be expelled from the town if they acted contrary to the community's regulations. The several governing bodies all kept meticulous records; copies were sent to the Bethlehem and Herrnhut archives. Most of this information has been translated and published in the "Records of the Moravians in North Carolina" by the North Carolina State Archives, now comprising thirteen volumes. This detailed information is part of the documentation used for the accurate restoration and interpretation of Old Salem and many original documents are still housed in the Moravian archives.

- In 1849, Forsyth County was created, but Salem was unwilling to be the county seat and sold property directly to the north to become the new courthouse town. This town became Winston, which quickly grew into a thriving industrial center.
- In 1857, the church divested control of the town and allowed the residents to purchase their property. Salem then became a legal municipality. The town expanded twice, in 1889 and 1907.
- Salem merged with adjacent Winston in 1913, becoming known as Winston-Salem.

A local architectural review district was created in 1948 (the first in North Carolina and probably the fifth in the country) to protect the historic remains of what had become a depressed area from encroaching development. In 1950, Old Salem Inc. (a 501(c)(3) not-for-profit corporation) was formed to protect threatened buildings, restore the town and operate portions of it as a museum.

== Old Salem Museums and Gardens ==
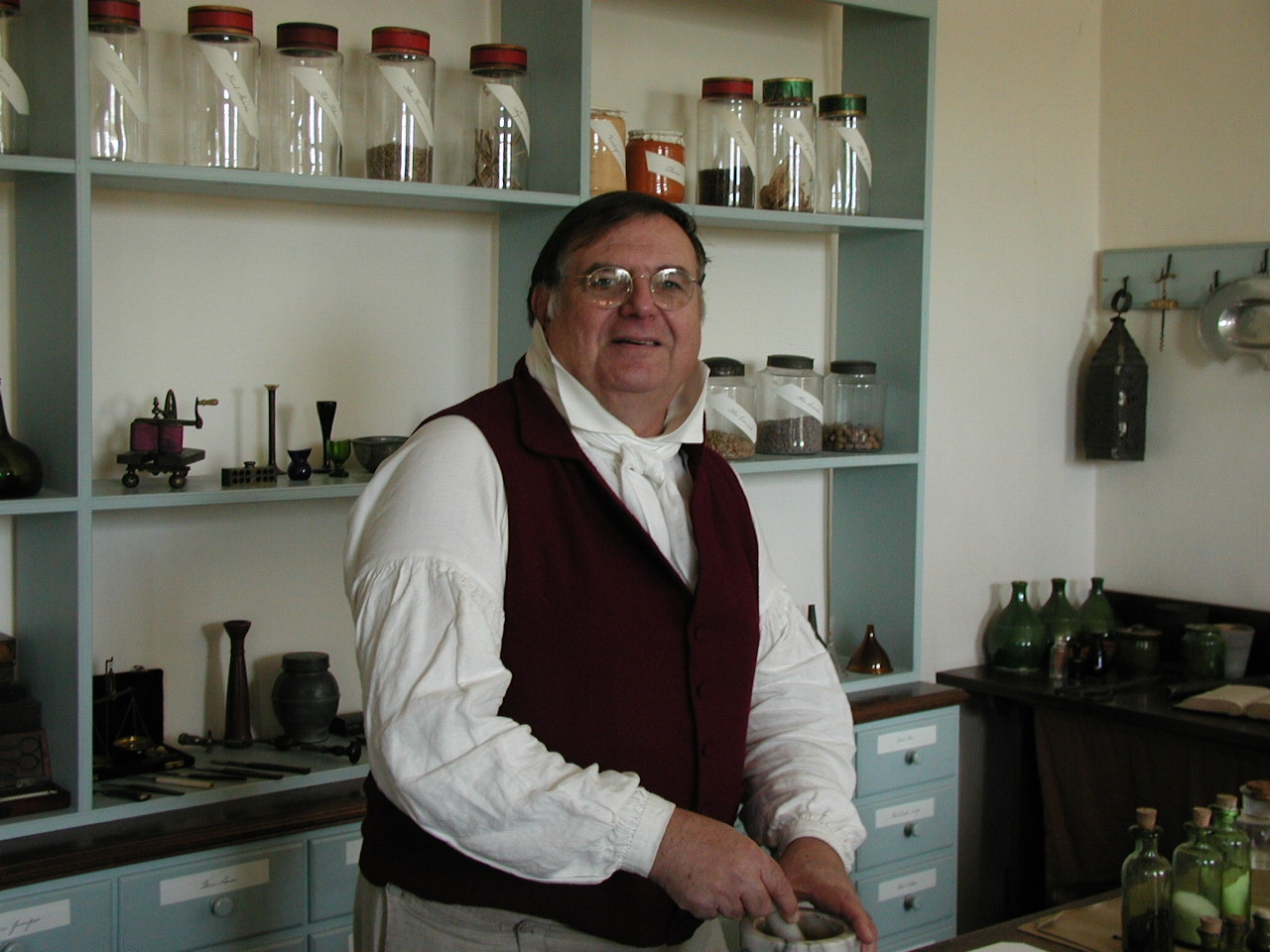
A museum interpreter explains aspects of a 19th-century apothecary in Old Salem

The town's restored and reconstructed buildings, staffed by living-history interpreters, present visitors with a view of Moravian life in the 18th and 19th centuries. The features include skilled interpreters such as tinsmiths, blacksmiths, cobblers, gunsmiths, bakers and carpenters, practicing their trades while interacting with visitors. Approximately 70% of the buildings in the historic district are original.

=== Points of interest ===
The village is centered around Salem Square, which is bounded by Academy Street to the north, Church Street to the east, West Street to the south and Main Street to the west. Salem College overlooks the square from Church Street.

==== Church Street ====
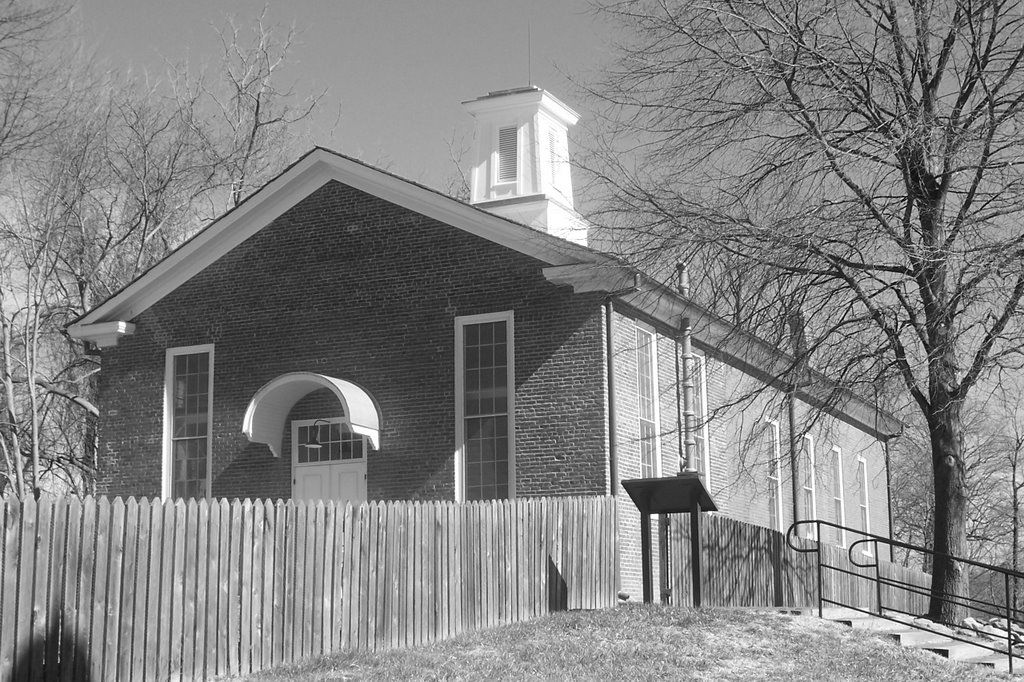
St. Phillips Moravian Church, Church Street

- African Moravian Log Church
- Anna Johanna Vogler House
- Dr. Samuel Vierling House and Barn (The Doctor's House)
- Home Moravian Church
- Moravian Church Archives
- Philip Reich House
- Philip Reich Shop
- Salem College
- Single Sisters' House Museum
- St. Philip's Heritage Center
- St. Philip's Moravian Church

==== Academy Street ====
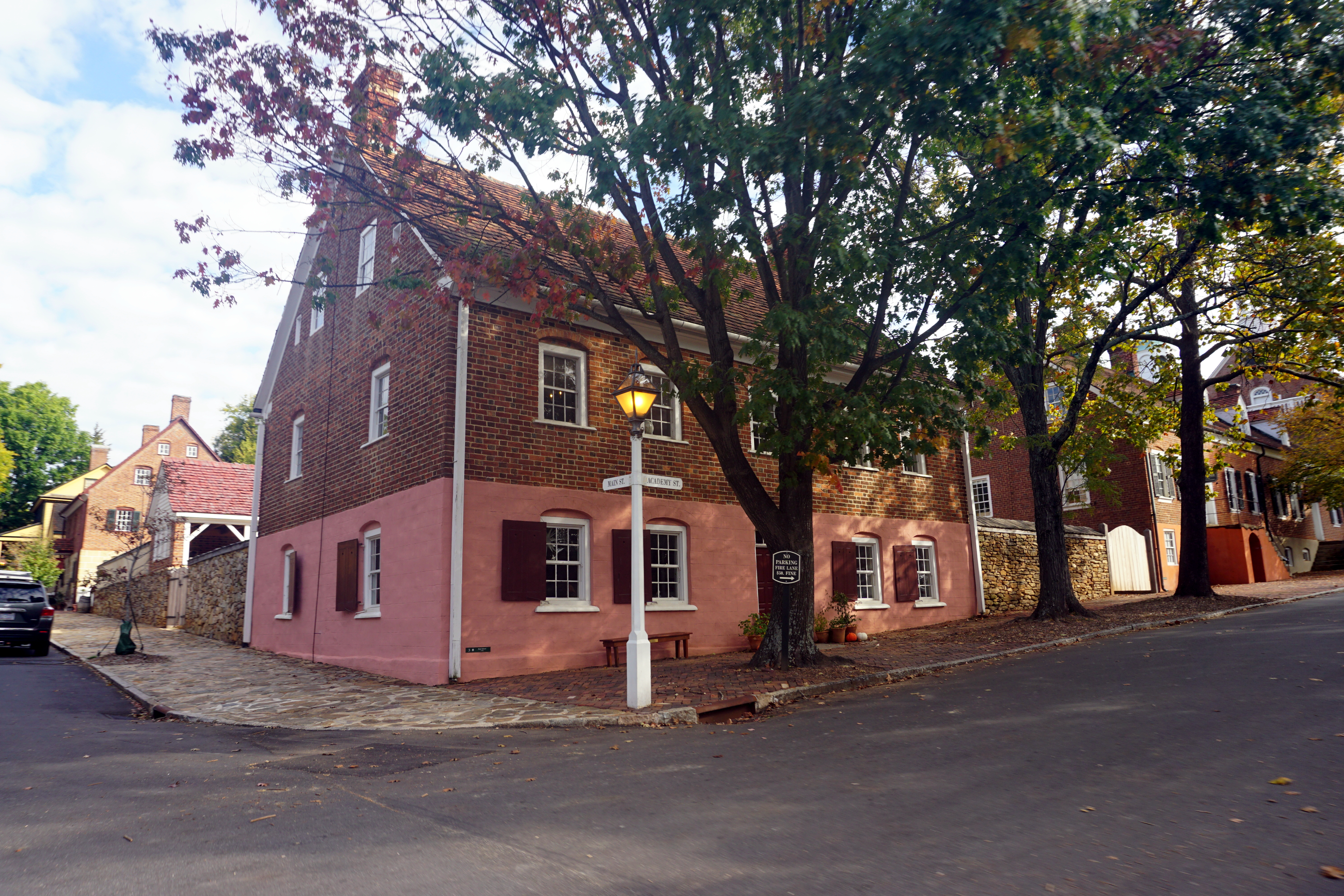
Boys' School, Academy Street

- Boys' School
- Inspectors' House
- Single Brothers' Workshop

==== Main Street ====
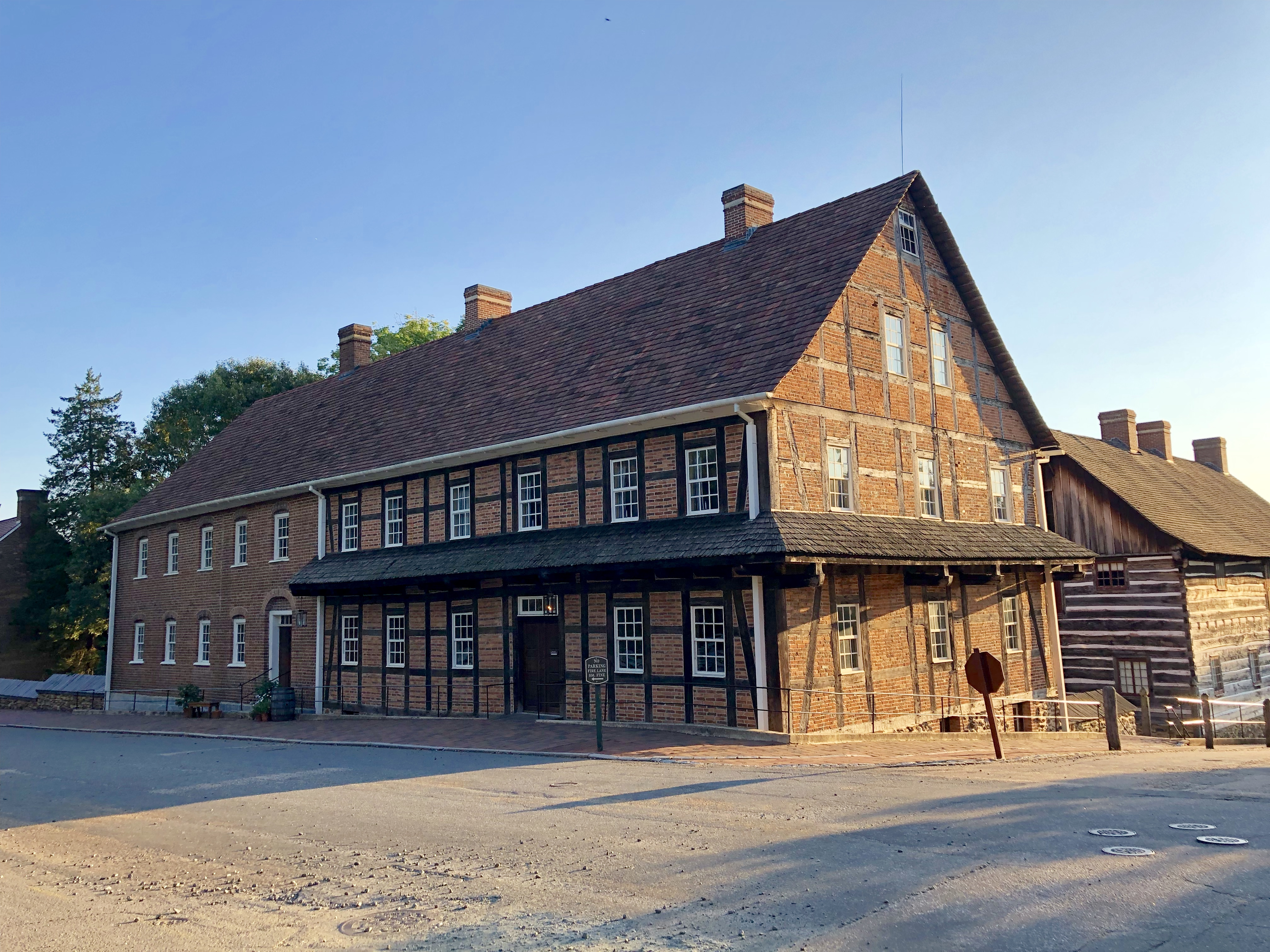
Single Brothers' House, Main Street

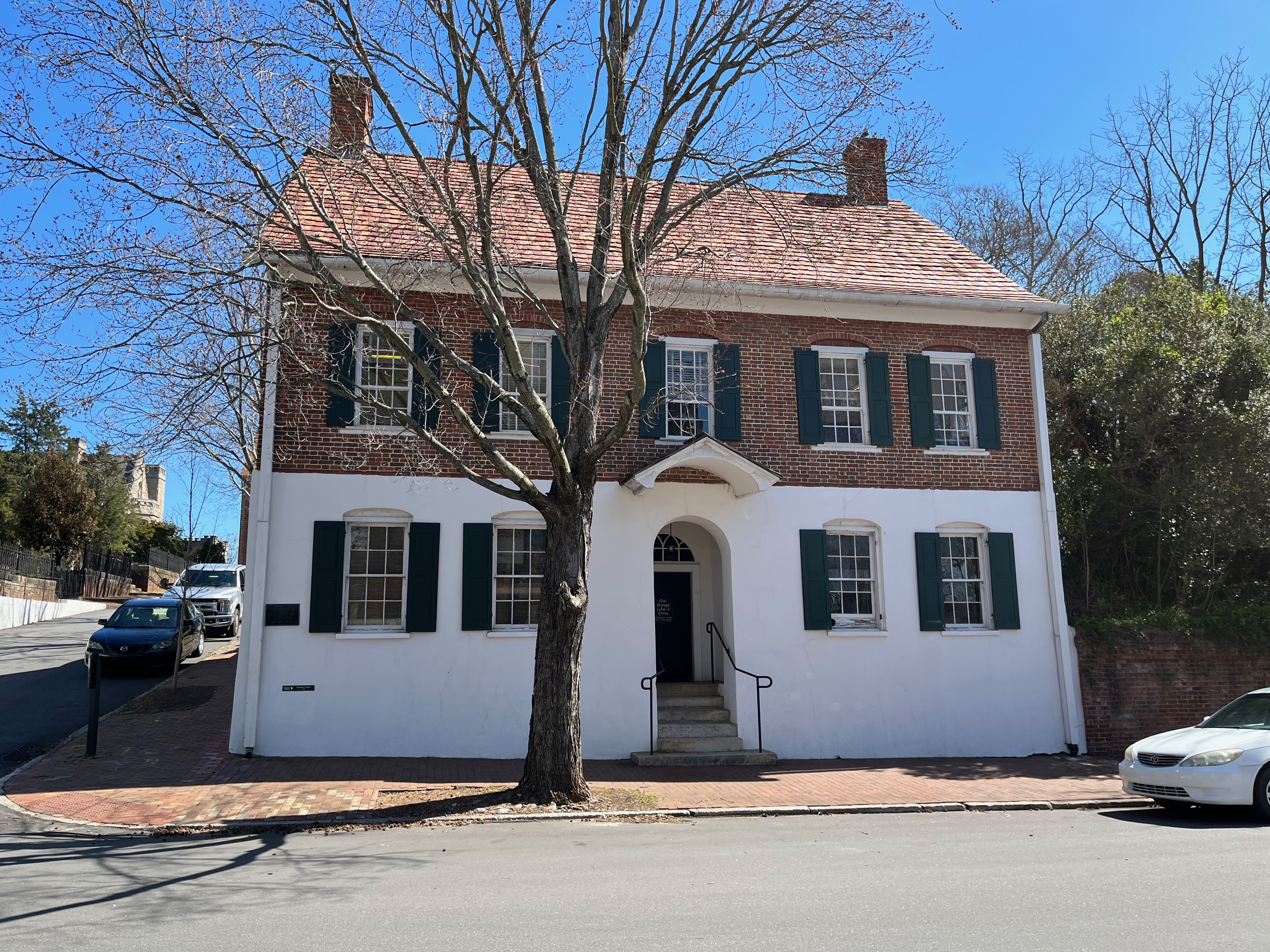
Vorsteher's House, Main Street

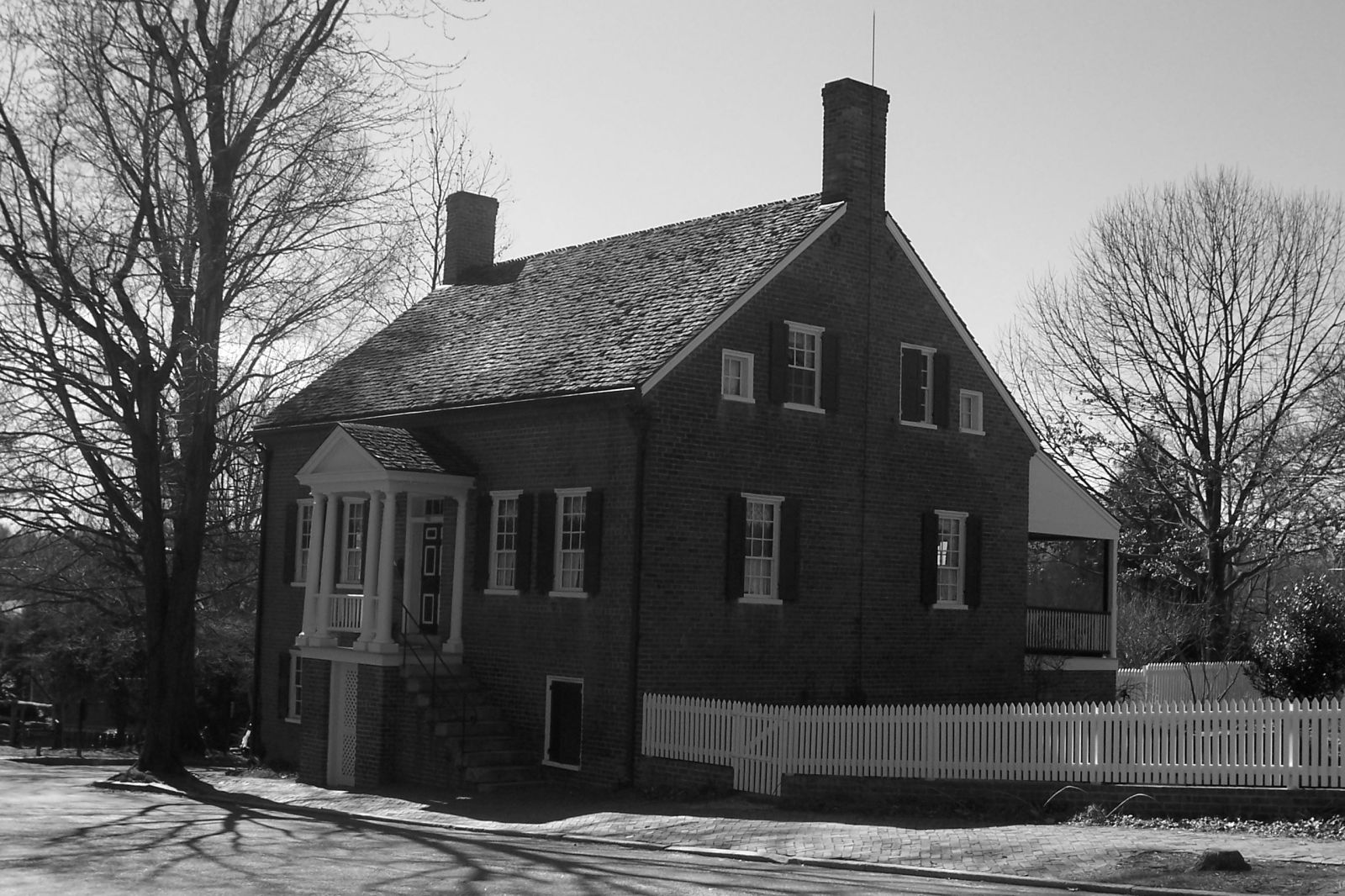
John Siewers House, Main Street

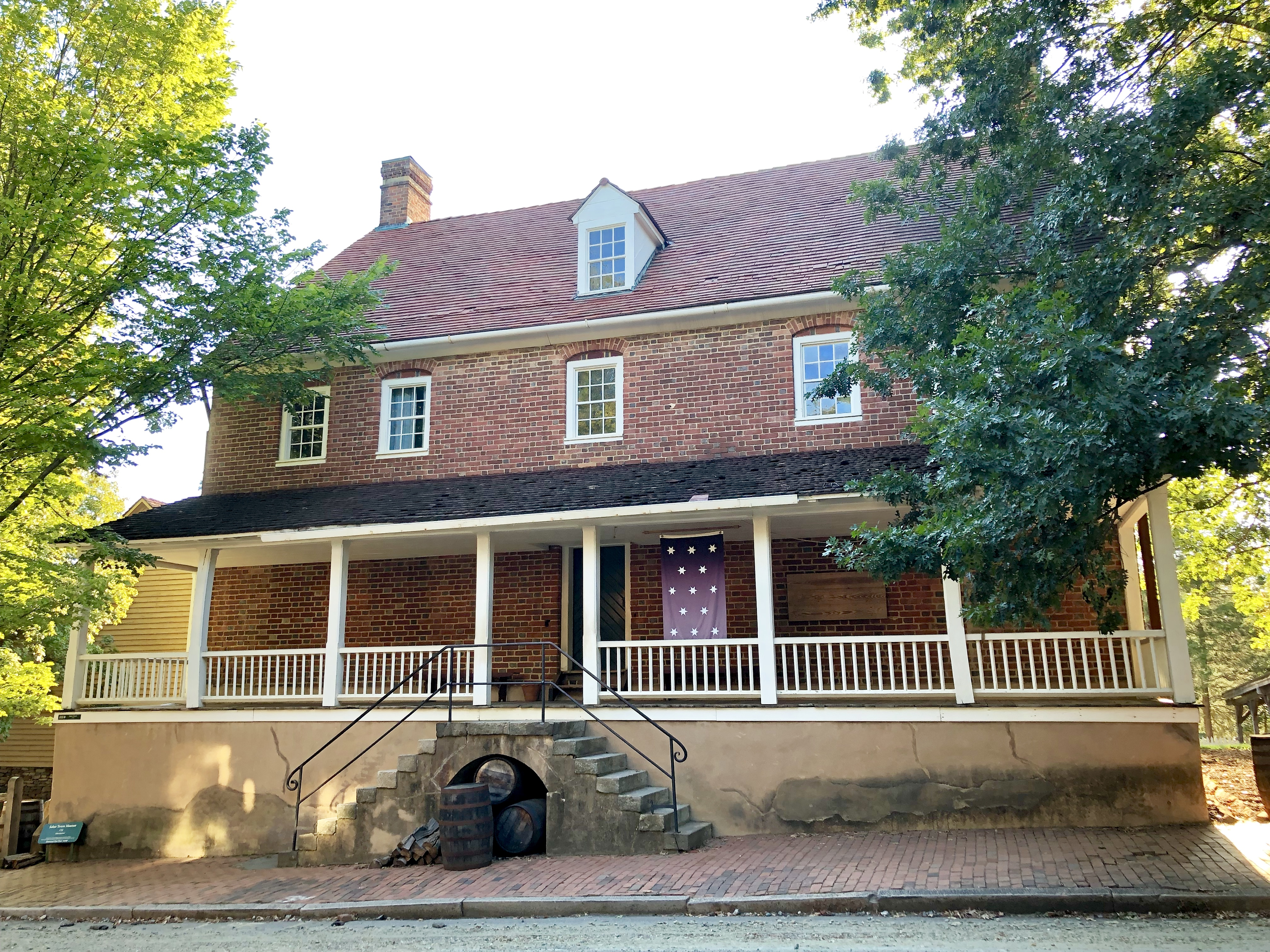
Salem Tavern, Main Street

- Augustus T. Zevely Inn
- Bank of Cape Fear
- Beitel-Van Vleck House
- Belo House
- Blum House
- Butner House
- C. Winkler Bakery
- Charles A. Copper House
- Charles A. Copper Shop
- Christoph Vogler House
- Community Store
- Dr. John Francis Shaffner House
- Eberhardt House and Shop
- Ebert-Reich House
- Fifth House
- First House
- Fourth House
- Gottlieb Schroeter House and Wash-Bake House
- Hall House
- Herbst House
- Jacob Siewers House
- John Siewers House
- John Vogler House
- Kuehln House
- Lick–Leinbach House, Granary and Stable
- Levering House
- Market–Fire Engine House
- Miksch Tobacco Shop
- Nathaniel Shober Siewers House
- Salem Tavern
- Salem Tavern Museum
- Shultz House and Shop
- Shultz Shoemaker Shop
- Single Brothers' House
- Tavern Meadow
- The Butner Shop
- Theophilus Vierling House
- Third House
- Timothy Vogler Gunsmith Shop
- Timothy Vogler House
- Traugott Bagge Merchant
- Traugott Leinbach House and Leinbach Wash-Bake House
- Volz House
- Vorsteher's House

==== West Street ====
- Anna Catherina House
- Traugott Bagge House

==== Salt Street ====
- Christman House
- Denke House
- Family Gardens
- Fruit Orchard
- Hagen House
- Jacob Christman House
- Lick-Boner House
- Miksch Gardens
- Salt-Flax House
- Solomon Lick House
- Christian Triebel Lot Garden

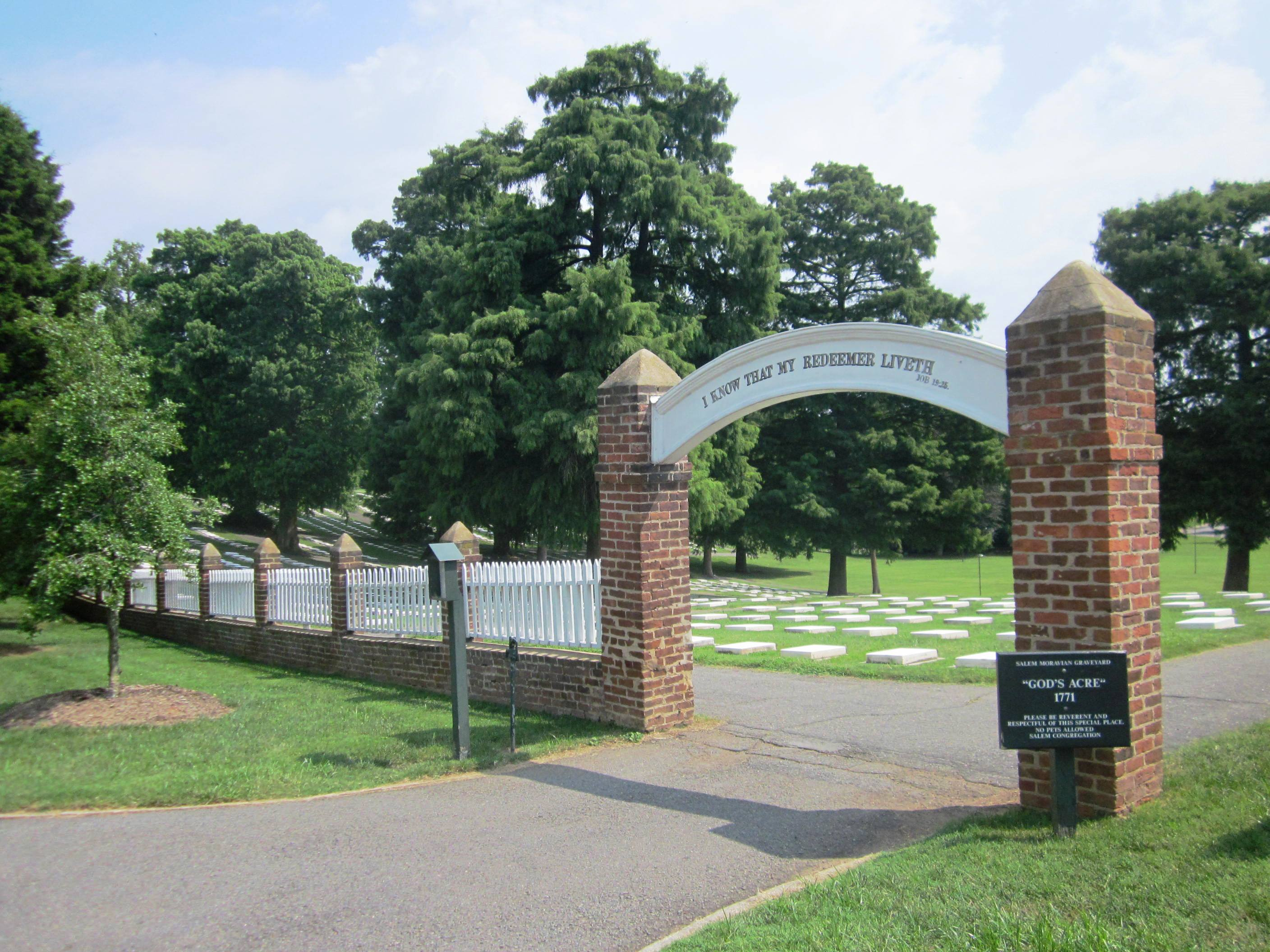
God's Acre Moravian Cemetery

Highlights of the town include the Salem Tavern, where George Washington spent two nights (May 31 and June 1, 1791) while passing through North Carolina during his "Southern Tour"; the Single Brothers' House; Boys' School; C. Winkler Bakery; and a host of restored homes and shops and several stores including Traugott Bagge Merchant and the Moravian Book and Gift Shop.

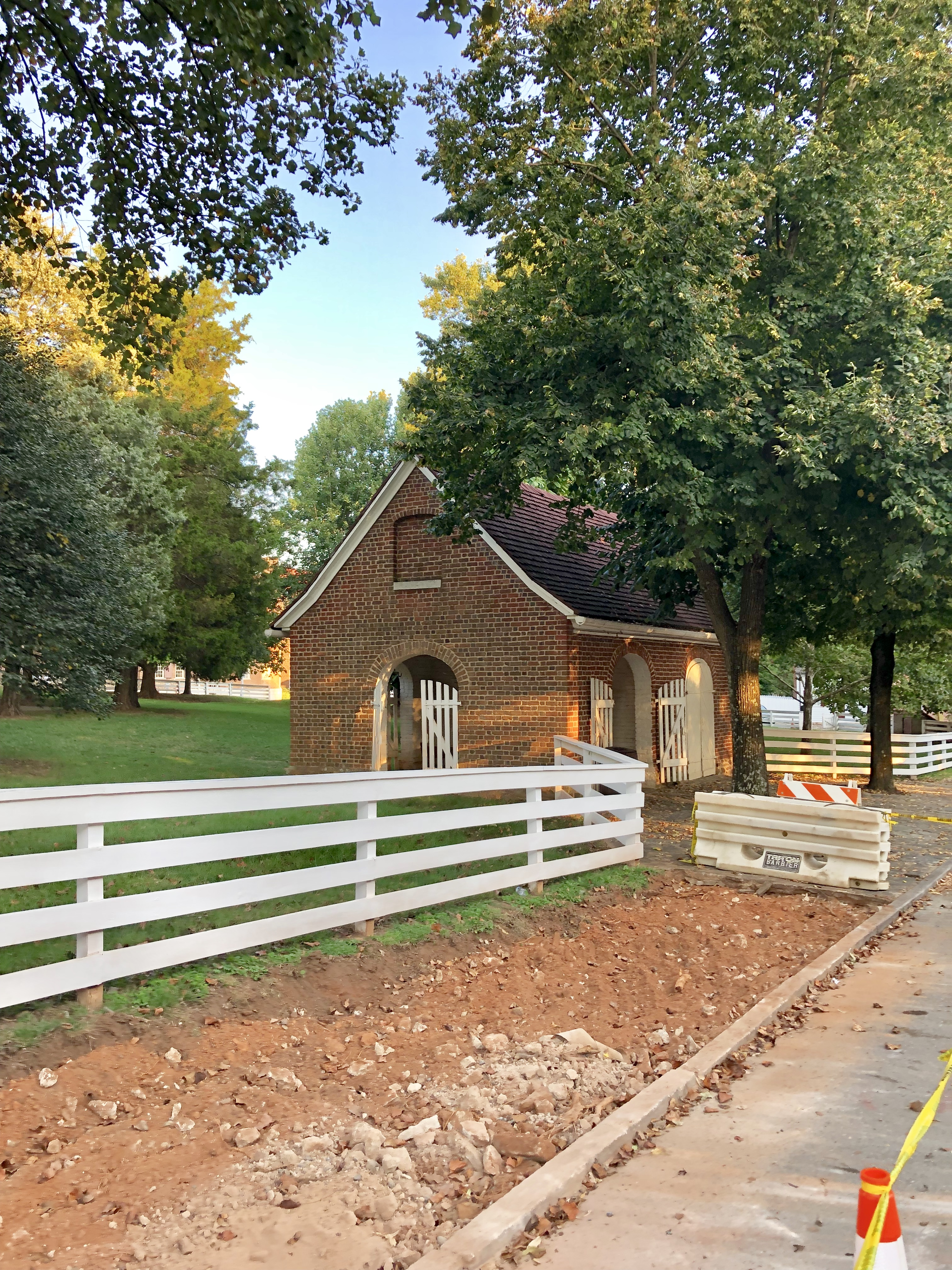
Market–Fire Engine House, Salem Square

Of note is the St. Philip's Moravian Church complex. The site of God's Acre, an 18th-century graveyard, the (now reconstructed) 1823 'Negro Church' was built following a congregational vote to segregate worship in accordance with North Carolina state law in 1816. Before that the African-Americans who joined the Moravian church attended Home Moravian Church. In 1861, St. Philip's Church was constructed. Now restored, the church was originally built by the Salem congregation for the enslaved and free African-Americans of the community. Completed just before the Civil War in 1861, it is the oldest surviving African-American church built for that purpose in North Carolina. The Emancipation Proclamation was read there to the congregation in 1865 by the chaplain of the 10th Ohio Regiment. The church continued to grow and was expanded in the 1890s. The congregation moved to a new location in 1952 then a third location on Bon Aire Avenue, before returning to hold services in the brick Church in 2019. The building stood vacant from 1952 until its restoration. St. Philip's Church is individually listed on the National Register of Historic Places.

Partially in the Old Salem historic district is the campus of Salem College and Academy, with Main Hall, the Single Sisters' House, the Inspectors House (with the president's office and the college book store) on the Square and Gramley Library just down Church Street.

Home Moravian Church, while not a part of the official Old Salem tour per se, this functioning congregation opens its sanctuary to visitors on a regular schedule. Still owned by the Salem Congregation, Salem Square, in the center of the district, hosts many special events throughout the year.

In Salem, the "Easter City," the traditional Moravian Easter sunrise service has been held annually since 1772 by the Salem Congregation, and draws several thousand people to the Salem Square and Moravian graveyard. The first two weeks of December play host to the Candle Tea, an annual fundraiser for local charities held by the Home Moravian Church Women's Fellowship in the Single Brothers' House.

The Market–Fire Engine House was constructed in 1803 (reconstructed in 1955). Half of it was used as a marketplace for fresh meat, and the other half was used to store fire fighting equipment. The town had been using this equipment since 1785, when the Salem Tavern was destroyed by fire. The fire company is thought to be the first of its kind in North Carolina.

At the north end of the historic district is a large Coffee Pot which is a former tin-shop sign, moved when Interstate 40 was built just to the north.

=== Visitor Center ===
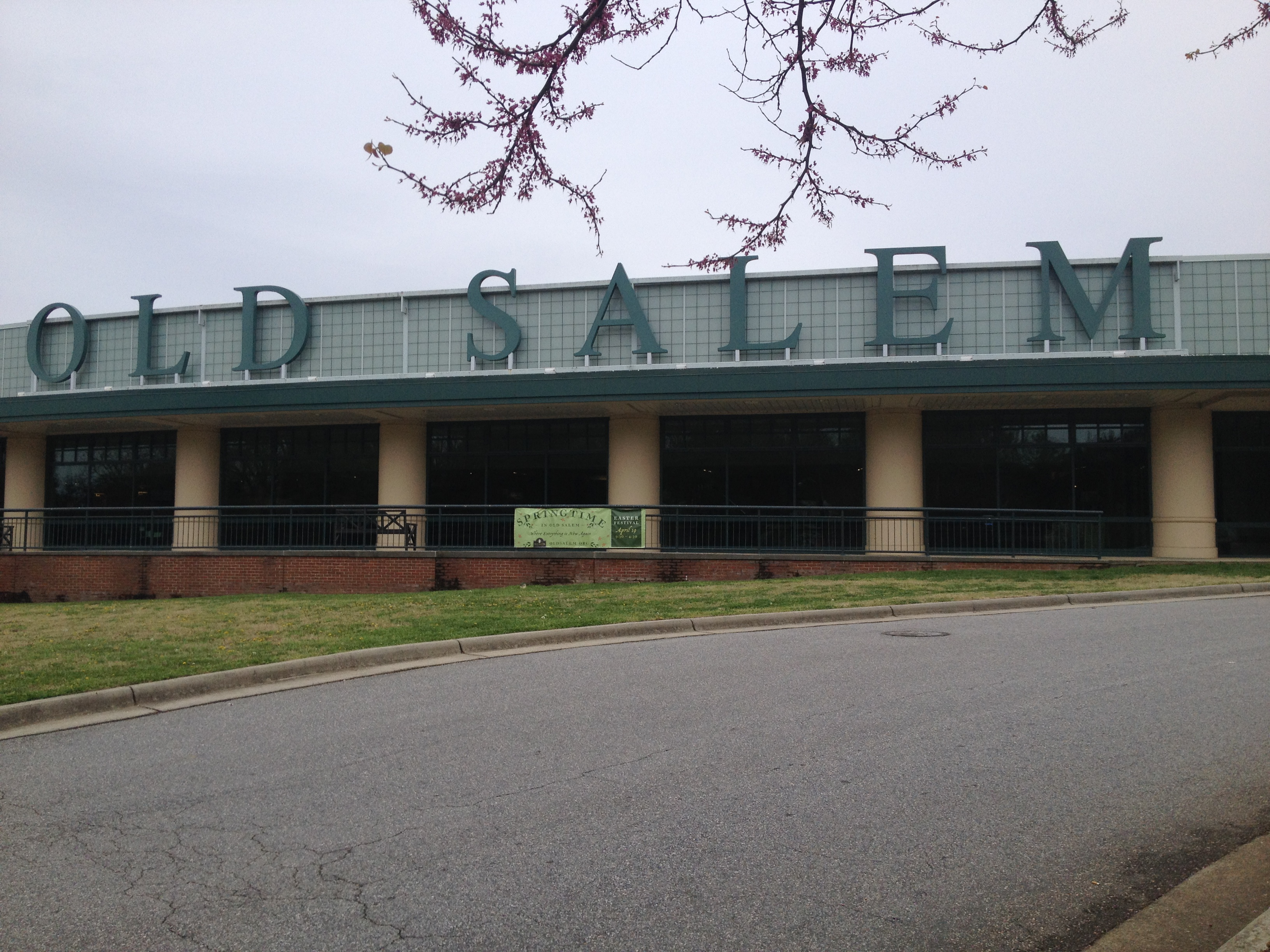
Visitor Center

Old Salem's Visitor Center was built in 2003 and is the main location where museum visitors purchase tickets. The building features a large concourse along a serpentine glass wall with interpretive panels about the history of Wachovia and Salem. The preliminary design was developed by Venturi Scott Brown and Associates, with local firm Calloway, Johnson, Moore and West completing the project. The building also houses a food service, gift shops and the James A. Gray Jr. Auditorium. The Gray Auditorium is home to the 1800 Tannenberg Organ.

The former 1964 visitor center and parking lot were demolished to allow partial reconstruction of the 18th-century Single Brothers' Garden.

=== Museum of Early Southern Decorative Arts ===
A part of Old Salem Museums & Gardens and located in a modern building in the historic district, the Museum of Early Southern Decorative Arts (MESDA) is dedicated to exhibiting and researching the regional decorative arts of the early South. MESDA opened to the public on January 5, 1965. MESDA was founded by Frank L. Horton and his mother Theodosia “Theo” L. Taliaferro, antiques dealers and collectors who spent most of their lives raising awareness of and appreciating domestic objects made in the south. In its galleries, MESDA showcases the architecture, needlework, furniture, paintings, textiles, ceramics, silver and other metalwares made and used in Maryland, Virginia, the Carolinas, Georgia, Kentucky and Tennessee through the early 19th century. The majority of the MESDA collection is accessible online.

== Notable people ==
- Gottfried Aust (1722–1788), potter
- Rudolph Christ (1750–1833), potter
- Johann Gottlob Krause (1760–1802), stonemason
- Elisabeth Oesterlein (1749–1802), educator
- Melchior Rasp (1715–1785), stonemason
- Christian Triebl (1714–1798), carpenter
- Christian Winkler (1766–1839), baker

== Hidden Town Project ==
Starting in December 2016, substantial historical and archaeological research has focused on Salem's historical African-American population. Moravians educated enslaved members of their community, teaching literacy skills and some professional trades. Holistic studies directed toward understanding ethnicity and cultural identity of African-Americans in Salem have resulted in significant additions to the historical interpretation presented at Old Salem. These additions include newly identified slave dwellings and the updated number of slaves who lived in Salem from 1790-1860.

The goals of this project are to:

1. To locate the sites of dwelling places of enslaved people throughout the entire historic district
2. To archaeologically investigate the sites.
3. To fully integrate the narrative of the enslaved into the visitor experience.
4. To connect with descendants of the Salem enslaved population and form an Advisory Committee to help direct future efforts at Old Salem.
5. To interpret through contemporary art forms, salon discussions and public gatherings.

== See also ==
- List of National Historic Landmarks in North Carolina
- National Register of Historic Places listings in Forsyth County, North Carolina
