= Futhark (programming language) =

Programming language

- Paradigm: array, functional
- Family: ML
- Designed by: Troels Henriksen, Cosmin Oancea, Martin Elsman
- Developer: University of Copenhagen
- First appeared: 2014; 12 years ago
- Typing discipline: inferred, static, strong, Hindley–Milner, uniqueness, dependent
- OS: cross-platform
- License: ISC
- Website: futhark-lang.org

Influenced by
- APL, Haskell, NESL, Standard ML

Futhark is a multi-paradigm, high-level, functional, data parallel, array programming language. It is a dialect of the language ML, originally developed at UCPH Department of Computer Science (DIKU) as part of the HIPERFIT project. It focuses on enabling data parallel programs written in a functional style to be executed with high performance on massively parallel hardware, especially graphics processing units (GPUs). Futhark is strongly inspired by NESL, and its implementation uses a variant of the flattening transformation, but extended to efficiently support the special case of uniform nested data parallelism. The Futhark compiler is free and open-source software released under an ISC license.

== Overview ==
Futhark is a language in the ML family, with an indentation-insensitive syntax derived from OCaml, Standard ML, and Haskell. The type system is based on a Hindley–Milner type system with a variety of extensions, such as uniqueness types and size-dependent types. Futhark is not intended as a general-purpose programming language for writing full applications, but is instead focused on writing compute kernels (not always the same as a GPU kernel) which are then invoked from applications written in conventional languages.

Futhark is named after the first six letters of the Runic alphabet.

== Examples ==
=== Dot product ===
The following program computes the dot product of two vectors containing double-precision numbers.

def dotprod xs ys = f64.sum (map2 (*) xs ys))

It can also be equivalently written with explicit type annotations as follows.

def dotprod [n] (xs: [n]f64) (ys: [n]f64) : f64 = f64.sum (map2 (*) xs ys))

This makes the size-dependent types explicit: this function can only be invoked with two arrays of the same size, and the type checker will reject any program where this cannot be statically determined.

=== Matrix multiplication ===
The following program performs matrix multiplication, using the definition of dot product above.

def matmul [n][m][p] (A: [n][m]f64) (B: [m][p]f64) : [n][p]f64 =
  map (\A_row ->
         map (\B_col -> dotprod A_row B_col)
             (transpose B))
      A

This shows how the types enforce that the function is only invoked with matrices of compatible size. Also, it is an example of nested data parallelism.
