= KX Systems =

Computer company founded by Arthur Whitney

KX
- Trade name: KX
- Type: Private
- Industry: Software & Tech Services
- Founded: 1993; 33 years ago in Palo Alto, California
- Founders: Janet Lustgarten; Arthur Whitney
- Headquarters: New York, New York, United States
- Number of locations: 14 offices (2018)
- Area served: Asia; Europe; North America
- Key people: Ashok Reddy; (CEO); Eric Raab; (CTO); David Humphries; (COO)
- Products: k; kdb+; q
- Parent: TA Associates
- Website: kx.com

KX is a privately owned software company that sells a time series database kdb+, used for financial modeling and data analysis, and its associated proprietary programming language q.

It was founded in 1993 by Janet Lustgarten and Arthur Whitney, the developer of the K programming language. In 2014, First Derivatives increased their ownership interest to 65 percent; in 2018, the company (now FD Technologies plc) announced plans to buy out the remaining shares of KX. KX has offices in New York City, London, England, Ireland, Germany, Australia, Singapore, Tokyo, and Hong Kong.

== Overview ==
In 1993, Whitney and Lustgarten joined to commercialize the k programming platform Whitney had created after building the A+ language and other trading systems at Morgan Stanley. The purpose of the software was to access and explore large data volumes in financial services computer systems. Initially, Kx Systems had an exclusive contract with Swiss global financial services firm UBS to provide them with the K language. In 1998, the contract with UBS expired and the firm launched the kdb+ database. As part of kdb+, Whitney developed a new language named q that operated with k and uses English keywords.

In 1999, the company reached a marketing agreement with a Northern Ireland based firm, First Derivatives.; it opened an office in Manhattan in 2002, Germany and Japan in 2003, and Hong Kong in 2009. In 2014, First Derivatives purchased a 65 percent share of Kx Systems. Kx became a technology supplier to NASA's Frontier Development Lab. In July 2018, FD Technologies bought all remaining shares in KX Systems that it did not already hold; Whitney and Lustgarten then went on to found Shakti.

In 2025, FD Technologies sold KX to TA Associates as part of their downsizing of spinning-off divisions such as the company and other subsidiary First Derivative which was sold to EPAM Systems.
