= SISAL =

- Paradigm: Functional, dataflow
- Designed by: James McGraw
- Developer: James McGraw et al., at University of Manchester, LLNL, Colorado State University, DEC
- First appeared: 1983; 43 years ago
- Typing discipline: Static, strong

Major implementations
- osc, sisalc

Influenced by
- VAL, Pascal, C, Fortran

Influenced
- Haskell, SAC

SISAL (Streams and Iteration in a Single Assignment Language) is a general-purpose single assignment functional programming language with strict semantics, implicit parallelism, and efficient array handling.

SISAL outputs a dataflow graph in Intermediary Form 1 (IF1). It was derived from the Value-oriented Algorithmic Language (VAL), designed by Jack Dennis, and adds recursion and finite streams. It has a Pascal-like syntax and was designed to be a common high-level programming language for numerical programs on a variety of multiprocessors.

== History ==
SISAL was defined in 1983 by James McGraw et al., at the University of Manchester, Lawrence Livermore National Laboratory (LLNL), Colorado State University and Digital Equipment Corporation (DEC). It was revised in 1985, and the first compiled implementation was made in 1986. Its performance is superior to C and rivals Fortran, according to some sources, combined with efficient and automatic parallelization.

SISAL's name came from grepping "sal" for "Single Assignment Language" from the Unix dictionary /usr/dict/words.

Versions exist for the Cray X-MP, Y-MP, 2; Sequent, Encore Alliant, DEC DEC VAX-11/784, dataflow architectures, KSR1, Inmos Transputers, and systolic arrays.

== Architecture ==
The requirements for a fine-grain parallelism language are better met with a dataflow programming language than a system programming language.

SISAL is more than just a dataflow and fine-grain language. It is a set of tools that convert a textual human readable dataflow language into a graph format (named IF1 - Intermediary Form 1). Part of the SISAL project also involved converting this graph format into runnable C code.

== SISAL Renaissance Era ==
In 2010 SISAL saw a brief resurgence when a group of undergraduates at Worcester Polytechnic Institute investigated implementing a fine-grain parallelism backend for the SISAL language.

In 2018 SISAL was modernized with indent-based syntax, first-class functions, lambdas, closures and lazy semantics within a project SISAL-IS.
