= Spreadsheet 2000 =

Spreadsheet 2000 is a discontinued spreadsheet program for Apple Macintosh computers, published by Casady & Greene, a distributor of many "smaller" Mac releases. It appears to have seen little in terms of sales, and was withdrawn from the market after only a short time. First released in 1993 as Let's Keep It Simple Spreadsheet, officially abbreviated Let's KISS, the product was renamed Spreadsheet 2000 for its 2.0 release in 1997.

Spreadsheet 2000, S2K for short, featured a unique way of building complex spreadsheets from a number of simpler ones containing only input or output data. This contrasts with the traditional spreadsheet model, where inputs, calculations and outputs are all placed into a single sheet and cannot be easily differentiated. For instance, if one wants to add two columns of three numbers, under a normal spreadsheet one would type the two sets of values into columns, say A and B, and then into C type the formula =A1+B1, which would appear on-screen as the results. The formula is then copied into the other cells in C. A user looking at the sheet would simply see three columns of numbers, and has no way to differentiate which values are the inputs and which the outputs.

S2K worksheet; three input sheetlettes (blue) are being used to create several outputs (grey). The Join operation merges the 2×2 and 1×2 sheets into a single 3×2, while the A + B results in a single 2×2 grid by adding the 1×2 grid to both columns of the 2×2.

Under S2K the same task is separated out to make it easier to understand. The user first creates two separate "sheetlettes" containing one column each, types the input numbers into them, and then connects the two together with the addition function, represented by an icon. The addition icon also has an output connector, and when this is connected to a third sheetlette, the results of the addition appear there automatically. The user could also connect the output to a sheetlette containing a single cell, in which case the addition function would sum all of the cells and display the single result.

Since every step of a calculation was represented by input and output sheetlettes as well as the operator icons, S2K worksheets could become cluttered. In order to address this, whole groups of sheets and icons could be selected and collapsed into a compound operator. From that point on, the operator worked just like one of S2K's built-in functions, allowing the user to connect inputs and outputs to it as normal.

The whole idea of S2K was to simplify the construction of simple spreadsheets. While it met that goal, the same features made more complex spreadsheets difficult to work with. For instance, trying to debug a complex formula in Excel simply requires the user to click on the cell and read the formula. The same task in S2K may be difficult, with the formula filling several pages or alternately being built several layers deep (compounds of compounds) so that there is no single view of the formula. Additionally S2K's own set of built-in functions was rather limited.

S2K was written entirely in Prograph.

== See also ==
- Lotus Improv
