= N8n =

German workflow-automation company

n8n
- Type: GmbH (private)
- Industry: Software as a service (SaaS), Workflow automation
- Genre: Task automation
- Founded: 2019
- Founder: Jan Oberhauser
- Headquarters: Berlin, Germany
- Area served: worldwide
- Key people: Jan Oberhauser (CEO)
- Products: AI orchestration platform
- Website: n8n.io

n8n (pronounced "n-eight-n", a contraction of "nodemation") is a workflow automation platform and the Berlin company, n8n GmbH, that develops it. Founded by Jan Oberhauser and first released publicly in 2019, n8n lets users build automations by wiring together applications, services and AI models in a visual, node-based editor, with the option to use custom JavaScript or Python. It runs as a self-hosted application or as a managed cloud service, and has been described in coverage as a source-available alternative to hosted tools such as Zapier and Make.

The code is published under what the company calls a "fair-code" model, a source-available licence that allows self-hosting and modification but bars reselling n8n as a competing hosted service. n8n topped the 2025 JavaScript Rising Stars ranking by GitHub stars added over the year, raised a $180 million Series C in October 2025 at a $2.5 billion valuation, and in May 2026 took a strategic investment from SAP that roughly doubled that valuation.

== History ==
=== Founding ===
n8n was founded by Jan Oberhauser in Berlin, and the project launched publicly in October 2019. The company, n8n GmbH, was entered in the Berlin commercial register on 27 November 2019. The name is a numeronym derived from "nodemation", a blend of the editor's node view, the Node.js runtime and "automation", later shortened to "n8n". Before starting the company, Oberhauser worked in film as a visual-effects artist and pipeline engineer, with credits including Pirates of the Caribbean: On Stranger Tides.

=== Funding ===
In March 2020, n8n raised $1.5 million in seed funding co-led by Sequoia Capital and firstminute capital. A $12 million (about EUR 10 million) Series A followed in April 2021, led by Felicis Ventures with Sequoia, firstminute and Harpoon taking part. At that stage the platform integrated with more than 200 applications and had a community of roughly 16,000 developers and "citizen developers".

In March 2025 n8n closed a EUR 55 million (about $60 million) Series B led by Highland Europe, joined by HV Capital and earlier backers, at a reported valuation of about EUR 250 million. In October 2025 it raised $180 million in a Series C led by Accel, with Meritech, Redpoint, Visionaries Club, Evantic, NVIDIA's NVentures and Deutsche Telekom's T.Capital taking part alongside returning investors. The round valued the company at $2.5 billion and brought total funding to about $240 million.

In May 2026 SAP made a strategic investment reported at more than EUR 60 million for a stake of around 1.3%, valuing n8n at about $5.2 billion and making it, by that measure, Germany's most valuable AI company. As part of the deal n8n's technology is being embedded in SAP's Joule Studio.

== Platform ==
n8n is built on Node.js and TypeScript and presents automations as a visual editor in which users connect "nodes", each standing for an application, service or operation, into a workflow. Where the visual nodes fall short, users can write JavaScript or Python in a code node. Coverage in 2025 put the number of integrations in the several hundreds, with cited figures running from about 400 to over 1,000.

== Artificial intelligence features ==
From 2022, and more visibly from 2024, n8n reoriented around artificial intelligence. It added tools for building "AI agents", workflows that call large language models to make decisions and trigger other tools, an AI workflow builder that turns natural-language prompts into automations, and integration with frameworks such as LangChain through a set of dedicated AI nodes. Trade coverage tied n8n's 2025 growth to this shift, reporting roughly sixfold growth in users and tenfold growth in revenue over the year, with annual recurring revenue above $40 million. In 2026 the company entered a partnership with Deutsche Telekom, which became a certified partner offering n8n licences, implementation and training for mid-sized businesses.

== Licensing ==
n8n's source code is publicly available under what the company calls a "fair-code" model. From its 2019 launch the project used the Apache License 2.0 with the Commons Clause, which keeps the source readable while barring commercial resale. Because these terms restrict commercial use, the licence sits outside the Open Source Initiative's Open Source Definition, and commentators have described n8n as source-available rather than open source; the early "open source" framing drew criticism from developers, including a 2019 issue on the project's own tracker. The company says it later replaced the Commons Clause arrangement with its own Sustainable Use License, which it adopted in March 2022.

== Reception ==
n8n has been positioned in coverage as a flexible, self-hostable alternative to hosted automation services such as Zapier and Make, aimed at more technical users. Its adoption climbed sharply in 2025: in the JavaScript Rising Stars ranking built from Best of JS data, n8n added more than 112,000 GitHub stars over the year to finish first overall, the largest single-year total in the ranking's ten-year run, up from about 17,000 stars and fifth place in 2024. The speed of its valuation increases also drew scepticism, with Sifted questioning in August 2025 whether the company was worth its reported price relative to comparable software firms. During the Series C, Vodafone was revealed as one of its customers. n8n has also been used as a reference workflow-automation tool in academic model-driven engineering research.
