= Arthur Whitney (computer scientist) =

Canadian computer scientist

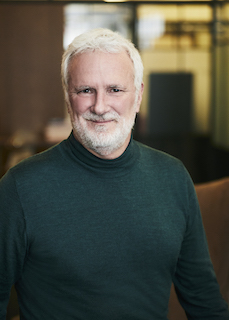
- Born: October 20, 1957 (age 68)
- Education: University of Toronto, pure mathematics, graduate level
- Known for: Programming languages: A+, k, q Kx Systems (co-founder)
- Scientific career
- Fields: Computer Science
- Institutions: I.P. Sharp Associates; Stanford University 1985; Teknowledge; Morgan Stanley 1988-1993; Kx Systems 1993-2018 (co-founder); Shakti Software 2018-present (co-founder)

Arthur Whitney (born October 20, 1957) is a Canadian computer scientist most notable for developing three programming languages inspired by APL: A+, k, and q, and for co-founding the U.S. companies Kx Systems and Shakti Software.

== Career ==
Whitney studied pure mathematics at the graduate level at the University of Toronto in the early 1980s. He then worked at Stanford University. He was first exposed to APL when he was 11 by its inventor, Ken Iverson, a family friend. He later worked extensively with APL, first at I. P. Sharp Associates alongside Ken Iverson and Roger Hui among others. Whitney is recognized as having had an "enduring and significant influence on APL" and he co-authored papers with both Ken Iverson and Roger Hui. He also wrote the initial prototype of J, a terse and macro-heavy single page of code, in one afternoon, which then served as the model for J implementor, Roger Hui, and was responsible for suggesting the rank operators in J. In 1988, Whitney began working at Morgan Stanley developing financial applications. At Morgan Stanley, Whitney developed A+ to facilitate migrating APL applications from IBM mainframe computers to a network of Sun Microsystems workstations. A+ had a smaller set of primitive functions and was designed for speed, and to handle large sets of time series data.

In 1993, Whitney left Morgan Stanley and co-founded Kx Systems with Janet Lustgarten, to commercialize his k programming language. According to Paul Ford's 2015 cover-story for Businessweek, k is a programming language that is "famous for its brevity." The company signed an exclusive agreement with Union Bank of Switzerland and Whitney developed a variety of trading applications using k until the contract expired. At the outset of the contract Whitney developed the kdb database built on k. In 2003, Kx Systems released q, a new vector language that built upon k and the kdb+ database developed by Whitney.

In 2018, First Derivatives bought out Whitney and Lustgarten's minority shares of Kx Systems. Whitney and Lustgarten then founded Shakti.

The Shakti platform has a small memory footprint, and allows for fast deployment and processing of distributed elastic workloads. It can work with all kinds of datasets, including numerical, temporal and text data, whether structured or not.
