= Céu (programming language) =

- Developer: Francisco Sant'Anna
- First appeared: April 3, 2014
- Stable release: v0.30 / March 21, 2018
- Website: www.ceu-lang.org

Influenced by
- C

Céu is a synchronous reactive language intended for front-end applications that aims to be a safer alternative to C and C++. Céu supports synchronous concurrency with shared memory and deterministic execution and has a small memory footprint.

== History ==
Early versions of Céu were developed in 2011 by Francisco Sant'Anna during his research at the Pontifical Catholic University of Rio de Janeiro.

== Examples ==
=== Hello World ===
A "Hello World!" program that repeats every 250 milliseconds is:

loop do
    await 250ms;
    _printf("Hello World!\n");
end

== Sources ==
- Sant'anna, Francisco; Rodriguez, Noemi; Ierusalimschy, R. (2018). "CÉU: EMBEDDED, SAFE, AND REACTIVE PROGRAMMING". Monografias Em Ciência da Computação. doi:10.17771/PUCRIO.DIMCC.25258. S2CID 58256421.
- Lima, Guilherme F.; Santos, Rodrigo C. M.; Ierusalimschy, Roberto; Haeusler, Edward H.; Sant’Anna, Francisco (1 August 2019). "A memory-bounded, deterministic and terminating semantics for the synchronous programming language Céu". Journal of Systems Architecture. 97: 239–257. doi:10.1016/j.sysarc.2019.01.014. ISSN 1383-7621.
- Sant' Anna, Francisco; Ierusalimschy, Roberto; Rodriguez, Noemi (16 March 2015). "Structured synchronous reactive programming with Céu". Proceedings of the 14th International Conference on Modularity. pp. 29–40. doi:10.1145/2724525.2724571. ISBN 9781450332491. S2CID 9834676.
