= A+ (programming language) =

Programming language

- Paradigm: Array
- Designed by: Arthur Whitney
- Developer: Morgan Stanley
- First appeared: 1988; 37 years ago
- Stable release: 4.22-1 / March 27, 2008; 17 years ago
- Typing discipline: Dynamic, strong
- License: GNU General Public License
- Filename extensions: .., .+, .a, .m
- Website: www.aplusdev.org

Major implementations
- A+

Influenced by
- APL

Influenced
- K

A+ is a high-level, interactive, interpreted array programming language designed for numerically intensive applications, especially those found in financial applications.

== History ==
In 1988, Arthur Whitney began work on the A programming language to replace APL. Other developers at Morgan Stanley extended it to A+, adding a graphical user interface (GUI) and other language features.

Arthur Whitney went on to create a proprietary array language named K. Like J, K omits the APL character set. It lacks some of the perceived complexities of A+, such as the existence of statements and two different modes of syntax.

== Features ==
A+ provides an extended set of functions and operators, a graphical user interface with automatic synchronizing of widgets and variables, asynchronous executing of functions associated with variables and events, dynamic loading of user compiled subroutines, and other features. A+ runs on many Unix variants, including Linux. It is free and open source software released under a GNU General Public License. A newer GUI has not yet been ported to all supported platforms.

The A+ language implements the following changes to the APL language:

- an A+ function may have up to nine formal parameters
- A+ code statements are separated by semicolons, so a single statement may be divided into two or more physical lines
- The explicit result of a function or operator is the result of the last statement executed
- A+ implements an object called a dependency, which is a global variable (the dependent variable) and an associated definition that is like a function with no arguments. Values can be explicitly set and referenced in exactly the same ways as for a global variable, but they can also be set through the associated definition.

Interactive A+ development is primarily done in the Xemacs editor, through extensions to the editor. Because A+ code uses the original APL symbols, displaying A+ requires a font with those special characters; a font named kapl is provided on the web site for that purpose.
