= List of people from Winston-Salem, North Carolina =

This is an incomplete list of notable people associated with U.S. city of Winston-Salem, North Carolina.

== Academics ==
- Stuart Bondurant, professor and dean emeritus at the UNC School of Medicine
- Coy Cornelius Carpenter, dean of the School of Medicine of Wake Forest University
- Adelaide Fries, foremost scholar of the history and genealogy of the Moravians
- Robert Huntley, president of Washington and Lee University
- Jacquelyne Jackson, sociologist and academic
- Harold L. Martin, chancellor of North Carolina Agricultural and Technical State University
- William T. Miller, professor of organic chemistry at Cornell University
- Virginia Newell, math professor at Winston-Salem State University and alderman of Winston-Salem
- Len Preslar, business educator and Distinguished Professor of Practice at Wake Forest University
- Florence Wells Slater, entomologist and schoolteacher
- Norman Adrian Wiggins, president of Campbell University
- Tanya Zanish-Belcher, director of Special Collections and Archives at the Z. Smith Reynolds Library at Wake Forest University

== Art and architecture ==
- Eleanor Layfield Davis, artist
- Helen Copenhaver Hanes, significant figure in the founding of the University of North Carolina School of the Arts
- Frank L. Horton, museum director and antiques dealer
- Earline Heath King, sculptor who specialized in portraits and statues
- Megan LeCrone, dancer and soloist with the New York City Ballet
- Willard C. Northup, architect
- Kathryn Reynolds, photographer
- William Roy Wallace, architect

== Business ==
- Celeste Beatty, first Black woman to own a brewery in the United States
- Jack O. Bovender Jr., former chairman and CEO of HCA Healthcare 2002–2009
- Stuart Epperson, chairman of Salem Communications Corporation
- Bowman Gray Sr., president and chairman of R. J. Reynolds Tobacco Company
- Anne Cannon Forsyth, Cannon textiles and R.J. Reynolds tobacco families heiress and founder and president of the North Carolina Fund
- Francis Henry Fries, textile businessman and industrialist
- James A. Gray Jr., president and chairman of R. J. Reynolds Tobacco Company in Winston-Salem and North Carolina Senate
- John Wesley Hanes, founder of Hanes clothing brand
- Phil Hanes, businessman, conservationist, and patron of the arts
- Velma Hopkins, labour rights activist who organized a strike against R. J. Reynolds Tobacco Company
- Rufus L. Patterson Jr., founder of the American Machine and Foundry; vice president of the American Tobacco Company
- R. J. Reynolds, founder of R. J. Reynolds Tobacco Company
- William Neal Reynolds, businessman with R. J. Reynolds Tobacco Company
- Lewis Rudolph, co-founder of Krispy Kreme Doughnuts
- Vernon Rudolph, co-founder of Krispy Kreme Doughnuts
- Moranda Smith, labor organizer and unionist
- Paul Trevithick, client partner and senior director at EPAM

== Entertainment ==
- John L. Adams, actor, comedian and director
- Ramin Bahrani, film director and screenwriter
- Elizabeth Campbell, public television executive
- Jerrod Carmichael, stand-up comedian, actor, and writer
- Howard Cosell, sportscaster
- Carter Covington, television show creator, writer, story editor and producer
- Bosley Crowther, film critic
- Jennifer Ehle, actress
- Nia Franklin, Miss America 2019
- Emily V. Gordon, writer and producer
- Charles Grant, actor
- Kathryn Grayson, actress and operatic soprano singer
- Pam Grier, actress
- Julianna Guill, actress
- Rosemary Harris, actress; Golden Globe, Emmy and Tony Award winner
- Jackée Harry, actress and comedian
- Burgess Jenkins, actor
- Darwin Joston, actor
- Tom Kent, nationally syndicated radio personality
- Allyn King, vaudeville actress and a Ziegfeld Follies performer
- Kelly-Anne Lyons, actress
- Angus MacLachlan, screenwriter
- Rusty Mills, Emmy-winning animator and director
- Cullen Moss, actor
- Harold Nicholas, film dancer, entertainer
- Jacqueline Novak, comedian and actress
- Daniel Peddle, film director and screenwriter
- Jeryl Prescott, actress
- Stuart Scott, sportscaster
- Stephen A. Smith, sports journalist, Winston-Salem State University alum, radio host, analyst for ESPN's First Take
- Meg Steedle, actress
- Tasha Marbury, reality show personality and cast member of Basketball Wives
- Jill Wagner, actress and TV host
- Rolonda Watts, television personality and actress
- Colleen Williams, news anchor with KNBC in Los Angeles
- Danny McBride, actor, NCSA 94-96
- Geno Segers, actor, graduated from East Forsyth
- Jada Pinkett Smith, actress and wife of Will Smith, attended NCSA
- Kenneth Utt, film producer and unit production manager
- Rolonda Watts, television and talkshow host
- Michael Wilson, director

=== Music ===
- 9th Wonder, Grammy award-winning hip-hop producer
- Sunshine Anderson, singer-songwriter
- B.o.B., hip-hop artist
- Obadiah Carter, member of the "5" Royales
- Mitch Easter, musician and record producer, founder of Drive-In Studio
- Ben Folds, singer-songwriter
- Guitar Gabriel, blues musician
- Curtis Hairston, soul/funk vocalist
- George Hamilton IV, country singer
- Byron Hill, songwriter
- Peter Holsapple, singer-songwriter
- Greg Humphreys, singer-songwriter and member of Dillon Fence and Hobex
- Kimberly Marshall, organist and organ scholar
- Chris Murrell, singer and former lead vocalist of the Count Basie Orchestra
- Ben Neill, classical composer
- Clarence Paul, songwriter and record producer
- Dusty Redmon, guitarist
- Louise Siddall, composer
- Sluice, indie rock musician
- Chris Stamey, musician, singer, songwriter, and record producer
- Becca Stevens, singer, songwriter, and guitarist
- Ernest Thompson, blind street musician
- TiaCorine, rapper
- Tichina Vaughn, operatic mezzo-soprano

== Literature and journalism ==
- Bonnie Angelo, journalist and author
- Maya Angelou, poet
- Bekah Brunstetter, playwright
- John Carroll, journalist and newspaper editor
- Gary Chapman, author
- Clement Eaton, historian and writer
- John Ehle, author
- Mary Garber, sports journalist
- Emily V. Gordon, writer, producer, and podcast host
- Karen L. Parker, journalist and first Black female graduate of the University of North Carolina at Chapel Hill
- Melissa Harris-Perry, journalist, political commentator, author
- Charlie Lovett, New York Times best-selling novelist and expert on both the works and life of Lewis Carroll
- Sarah McCoy, New York Times, USA Today, and internationally bestselling author
- T. R. Pearson, author of A Short History of a Small Place
- James Norwood Pratt, author on topics of tea and tea lore
- Riley Redgate, author of young adult fiction

== Military ==
- Lincoln Broyhill, record-setting tail gunner in World War II
- Daryl Caudle, admiral and Chief of Naval Operations
- Brad Cooper, admiral and commander, U.S. Central Command
- Walter J. Davis Jr., vice admiral in the United States Navy
- Gordon Gray, Secretary of the Army under President Truman and President Eisenhower's National Security Advisor
- Lawrence Joel, United States Army soldier; received Medal of Honor during the Vietnam War
- Henry Johnson, United States Army soldier; posthumously awarded the Medal of Honor for his actions in World War I
- Togo West, United States Secretary of Veterans Affairs, United States Secretary of the Army, General Counsel of the Navy
- Earl P. Yates, rear admiral in the United States Navy

== Politics and government ==
- Hannah Atkins, member of the Oklahoma House of Representatives 1968–1980, and the first African-American woman elected to it
- Frank Ballance, United States House of Representatives
- Stan Bingham, North Carolina General Assembly
- Burr Brock Sr., North Carolina House of Representatives and North Carolina Senate
- Jim Broyhill, Republican politician; served North Carolina in the U.S. House of Representatives and Senate
- Ted Budd, former United States representative and United States senator from North Carolina
- Richard Burr, United States senator
- Irving E. Carlyle, North Carolina lawyer and state leader
- R. Thurmond Chatham, U.S. House of Representatives
- Linda Combs, controller of the Office of Management and Budget in the Executive Office of the President
- H. R. Crawford, assistant secretary for Housing Management of the Department of Housing and Urban Development and Member of the Council of the District of Columbia
- Cal Cunningham, North Carolina Senate
- Elisabeth Epps, Colorado House of Representatives
- Dale Folwell, North Carolina State Treasurer and North Carolina House of Representatives,
- Linda Garrou, North Carolina Senate
- Voit Gilmore, director of the United States Travel Service and North Carolina Senate
- Peaches Golding, appointed by HM Queen Elizabeth II as High Sheriff of Bristol 2010–2011, awarded the OBE
- John Stephens Graham, Assistant Secretary of the Treasury and commissioner for the Internal Revenue Service and Atomic Energy Commission
- James A. Gray Jr., president and chairman of R. J. Reynolds Tobacco Company in Winston-Salem and North Carolina Senate
- Lyons Gray, secretary of the North Carolina Department of Revenue and North Carolina House of Representatives
- Kyle Hall, North Carolina House of Representatives
- Mabel Hampton, lesbian activist and contributor to the Lesbian Herstory Archives
- Ed Hanes, North Carolina House of Representatives
- John Wesley Hanes II, investment banker, corporate turnaround specialist, and Under Secretary of the United States Treasury
- John W. Hardwicke, Maryland House of Delegates
- Mark Harris, U.S. representative for North Carolina
- William Heaton, former chief of staff to Bob Ney
- Kevin Jennings, assistant deputy secretary for the Office of Safe and Drug-Free Schools at the U.S. Department of Education
- Mark Johnson, North Carolina's Superintendent of Public Instruction
- Walter E. Johnston III, United States House of Representatives
- Allen Joines, mayor of Winston-Salem
- Annie Brown Kennedy, politician and lawyer; first Black woman to serve in the North Carolina House of Representatives
- Jules Gilmer Korner Jr., judge of the United States Board of Tax Appeals
- Donny Lambeth, North Carolina House of Representatives
- Norman M. Miller, United States Navy officer; one of the most decorated Naval Aviators during World War II
- Wilmer "Vinegar Bend" Mizell, MLB pitcher for Pirates and Cardinals, and US congressman 1968–1967
- Derwin Montgomery, North Carolina House of Representatives
- Lorraine H. Morton, mayor of Evanston, Illinois
- Roxie Nicholson, career staffer at the United States Department of Labor
- Ray Osborne, served as the first Lieutenant Governor of Florida under the state constitution of 1968
- Earline Parmon, North Carolina Senate
- Rufus Lenoir Patterson, mayor of Salem, North Carolina
- R. J. Reynolds Jr., treasurer of the Democratic National Committee and mayor of Winston-Salem
- Grace Rohrer, Secretary of Administration of North Carolina and Secretary of Cultural Resources of North Carolina
- Anna Harris Stein, First Lady of North Carolina
- Evelyn Terry, North Carolina House of Representatives
- Bennetta Bullock Washington, "first first lady" of Washington, D.C., director of Job Corps for Women at the Department of Labor
- Larry W. Womble, North Carolina General Assembly
- Madie Hall Xuma, president of the African National Congress Women's League

== Religion ==
- J. Neil Alexander, 9th bishop of the Episcopal Diocese of Atlanta
- Stuart Epperson, evangelical who was the co-founder and chairman of Salem Media Group
- J. D. Greear, 62nd president of the Southern Baptist Convention
- Herbert Spaugh, bishop of the Moravian Church

== Science and technology ==
- Roy F. Brissenden, NASA physicist
- Burton C. Gray, co-founder of Scientific Time Sharing Corporation
- Lisa Hensley, microbiologist, associate director of science at the Office of the Chief Scientist of the National Institute of Allergy and Infectious Disease
- Joseph Gaither Pratt, psychologist who specialized in parapsychology
- James Francis Shober, first professionally trained African-American physician to practice in North Carolina

== Sports ==
=== Baseball ===
- Dustin Ackley, outfielder for the New York Yankees
- Koke Alexander, Negro leagues outfielder
- Fred Anderson, former Major League Baseball player
- Don Cardwell, former Major League Baseball pitcher; World Series champion
- Alvin Crowder, Major League Baseball pitcher; World Series champion
- Alex Crumbley, baseball outfielder in the Negro leagues
- Spencer Davis, baseball infielder in the Negro leagues
- Ryan Dull, Major League Baseball pitcher
- Harvey Gentry, former Major League Baseball player
- Rufe Gentry, former Major League Baseball player for the Detroit Tigers
- Mark Grace, first baseman for Chicago Cubs and Arizona Diamondbacks, World Series champion, broadcaster and coach
- Tommy Gregg, former Major League Baseball player
- Napoleon Hairston, Negro league outfielder
- Ed Lyons, Major League Baseball second baseman
- D. J. Mitchell, Major League Baseball pitcher
- Wilmer "Vinegar Bend" Mizell, MLB pitcher for Pirates and Cardinals, and US congressman 1968–1967
- Howie Nunn, former Major League Baseball player
- Ernie Shore, former Major League Baseball pitcher, two-time World Series champion and sheriff of Forsyth County, North Carolina
- Seth Simmons, professional baseball player
- Bill Slack, professional baseball player, coach, and manager
- Robert Woodard, baseball player and collegiate coach

=== Basketball ===
- Cy Alexander, college basketball coach
- Norton Barnhill, professional basketball player
- Randolph Childress, former professional basketball player
- Hubert Davis, head coach of the men's basketball team at the University of North Carolina at Chapel Hill, basketball analyst for ESPN, former NBA player
- Rick Duckett, college basketball coach
- Lindsay Edmonds, college basketball coach
- C.E. "Big House" Gaines, head basketball coach of Winston-Salem State University for 47 years; member of Basketball Hall of Fame
- Danny Gathings, retired basketball player
- Harry Giles III, professional basketball player for the Portland Trail Blazers
- Herm Gilliam, professional basketball player
- Happy Hairston, professional basketball player for Los Angeles Lakers; NBA Champion
- C. J. Harris, basketball player in the Israeli Basketball Premier League
- Ricky Hickman, professional basketball player
- Whit Holcomb-Faye, professional basketball player
- Brian Howard, professional basketball player
- Josh Howard, professional basketball player and coach
- Othello Hunter, professional basketball player in the Israeli Basketball Premier League
- Reggie Johnson, professional basketball player
- Rusty LaRue, professional basketball player; NBA champion
- Camille Little, WNBA player
- Caleb Martin, twin brother of Cody Martin, professional basketball player for the Miami Heat
- Cody Martin, twin brother of Caleb Martin, professional basketball player for the Charlotte Hornets
- John Meeks (born 1999), basketball player in the Israeli Basketball Premier League
- Earl Monroe, professional basketball player for New York Knicks and Baltimore Bullets
- Benny Moss, college basketball coach
- Ryan Odom, college basketball coach
- Tyson Patterson, professional basketball player
- Chris Paul, professional basketball player, 12x NBA All-Star and two-time Olympic champion
- Josh Pittman, professional basketball player
- Willie Porter, professional basketball player
- Skip Prosser, professional basketball player
- Juvonte Reddic, professional basketball player in the Israeli Basketball Premier League
- Brian Robinson, college basketball coach
- Reyshawn Terry, professional basketball player and 2005 NCAA champion with North Carolina
- Kevin Thompson, professional basketball player

=== Football ===
- Ray Agnew, professional football player and executive
- Ray Agnew III, professional football player
- Hubbard Alexander, professional football coach
- Bracy Bonham, Canadian Football League player
- Hal Bradley, professional football player
- Kidd Brewer, college football player and administrator
- Alan Caldwell, professional football player
- Tony Covington, professional football player
- Angelo Crowell, professional football player
- Germane Crowell, professional football player
- Donnie Davis, professional football player
- Divine Deablo, professional football player
- Kenny Duckett, professional football player
- Carl Eller, professional football player; member of the College Football Hall of Fame and the Pro Football Hall of Fame
- Clement M. Eyler, college football coach
- Ed Gainey, Canadian Football League player
- Paul Gibson, professional football player
- George Godsey, professional football player
- Chris Hairston, professional football player
- Josh Hawkins, professional football player
- Madison Hedgecock, professional football player
- KJ Henry, professional football player
- Dwayne Ijames, professional football player
- Bill Jackson, professional football player
- Anthony Levine, professional football player and two-time Super Bowl champion
- Alex McCalister, professional football player
- Bill McKoy, professional football player
- Ja'Quan McMillian, professional football player
- Doug Middleton, professional football player
- Paul Miles, professional football player
- Jackie Mitchell, Canadian Football League player
- Aric Morris, professional football player
- A. J. Nicholson, professional football player
- Darrell Nicholson, professional football player
- Derek Nicholson, professional football player and college football coach
- Artimus Parker, professional football player
- Denzel Rice, professional football player
- Sherman Simmons, college football coach
- Darryl Sims, professional football player
- Speedy Speer, football player and coach
- Ramondo Stallings, professional football player
- Ryan Taylor, professional football player
- Steve Videtich, professional football player
- Blake Whiteheart, professional football player
- Bryce Williams, professional football player
- Jared Wilson, professional football player
- Tory Woodbury, professional football player
- Tom Young, college football coach

=== Golf ===
- Cydney Clanton, professional golfer
- Jim Ferree, professional golfer
- Jerry Haas, professional golfer
- Walter Hall, professional golfer
- David Mathis, professional golfer
- Arnold Palmer, professional golfer; attended Wake Forest University

=== Hockey ===
- Patrick O'Sullivan, National Hockey League player
- Ben Smith, National Hockey League player and 2013 Stanley Cup champion

=== Racing ===
- Dillon Bassett, NASCAR driver
- Ronnie Bassett Jr., NASCAR driver
- Ed Berrier, NASCAR driver
- Richard Childress, NASCAR team owner
- Barry Dodson, NASCAR crew chief
- Bobby Myers, NASCAR racing driver
- Chocolate Myers, NASCAR team principal
- Leon Sales, stock car racing driver

=== Soccer ===
- Tanner Beason, defender
- John Bradford, defender and coach
- Sam Cronin, midfielder
- Austin da Luz, midfielder
- Matt Spear, coach and sports executive
- David Testo, midfielder
- Wells Thompson, midfielder

=== Track and field ===
- Blake Russell, Olympic long-distance runner, competed at the 2008 Summer Olympics
- J-Mee Samuels, track and field sprinter

=== Other ===
- Kathleen Baker, Olympic swimmer, won gold and silver medal at 2016 Summer Olympics
- Michael Blomquist, rower and a former World Champion
- Ric Converse, professional wrestler
- Kimani Griffin, Olympic speed skater, competed at 2018 Winter Olympics
- Marc Johnson, professional skateboarder
- Randy Jones, Olympic bobsledder, won silver medal in the four-man event at 2002 Winter Olympics
- Brian McDonough, Olympic cyclist, competed at 1996 Summer Olympics
- Tab Thacker, NCAA wrestling national champion at NC State and actor
- Matthew Thomson, tennis player
- Chris Young, gymnast, won silver medal at 1999 Pan American Games

== Other ==
- Zachary Smith Reynolds, murder victim
- Hattie M. Strong, philanthropist
