= Deecy Gray =

American academic administrator

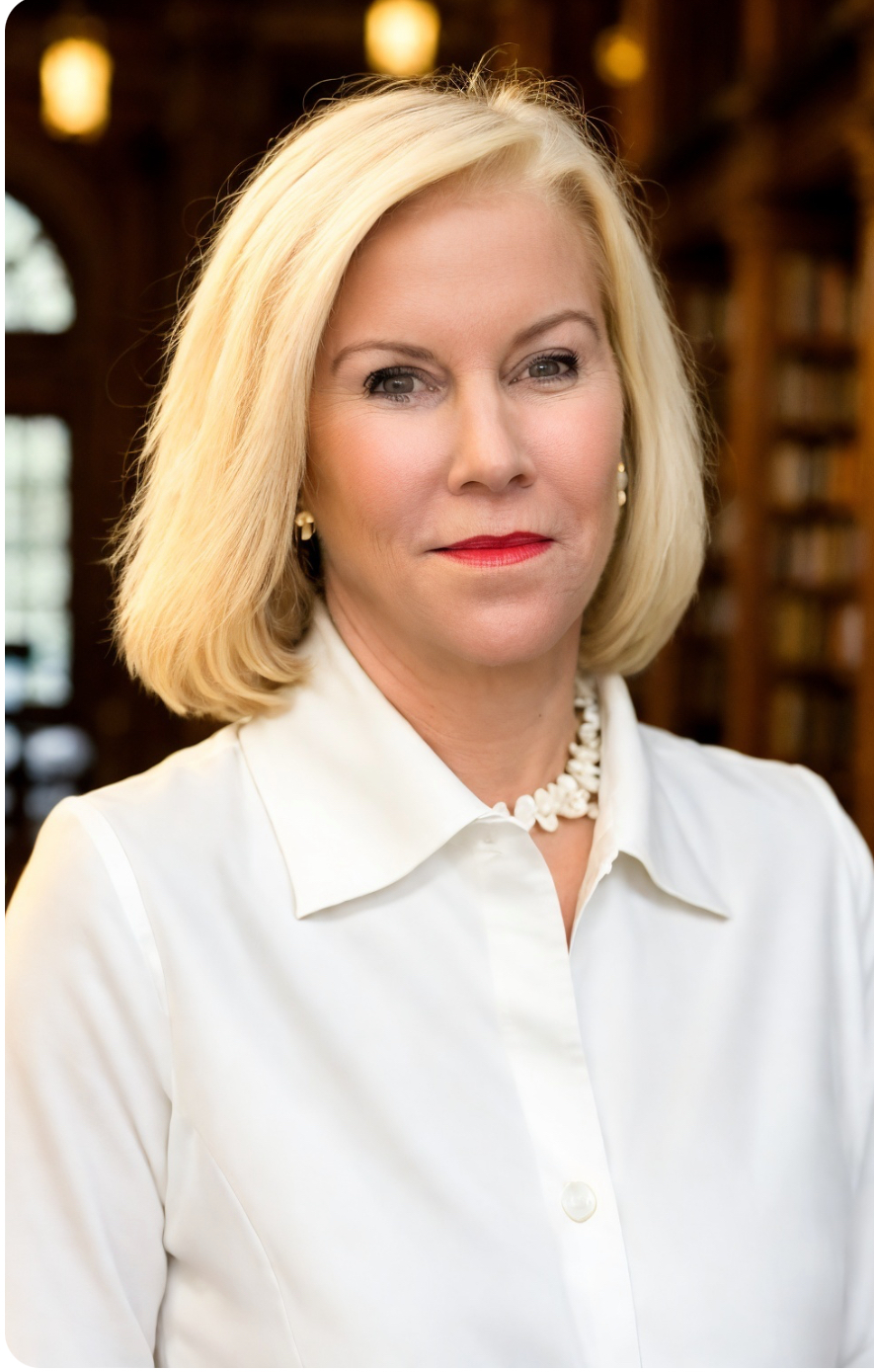

Personal details
- Occupation: President of Public Relations and Government Affairs of the company she founded
- Known for: Delegate and Ambassador designate to the 74th UN General Assembly for the United States

Dorothy (Deecy) Stephens Gray is a public relations executive. In 2019 she served as a delegate and Ambassador designate to the 74th UN General Assembly for the United States. She also is a Commissioner of the American Battle Monuments Commission (ABMC), serves on the George Mason University (GMU) Law School Advisory Committee of the Dean and the Atlas Foundation. Commissioner Gray is a board member of the Virginia Kincaid Philanthropic Foundation and was on the Board of Dubuque Packing Company, the Women's National Bank, Blair House, Citizens for a Sound Economy, the National Philanthropic Trust, and the Foundation for Research on Economics and the Environment, where she was Vice Chair.

Gray was appointed to a special task force to study the role of women in the military; in 1980, to the Board of Governors of the United Service Organizations; in 1990, to the U.S. Delegation to the United Nations Commission on the Status of Women; in 1999, to the U.S. Women's Progress Commemorative Commission.

She received her Bachelor of Arts from Marymount College, Tarrytown, and her Master of Arts from St. Louis University. She was Senior Vice President for Government Affairs & International Relations at Hellmuth, Obata, and Kassabaum; an editorial writer for the St. Louis Post-Dispatch and other papers. She is married to Douglas H. Ginsburg, a U.S. circuit judge on the United States Court of Appeals for the District of Columbia Circuit. Her late husband was Burton C. Gray, son of Gordon Gray and brother of C. Boyden Gray.

== Sources ==
- FREE Bio
- Appointment to GMU board
- Obituary of Burton Gray
