= Eyler =

Eyler is a surname. Notable people with the surname include:

- Clement M. Eyler (1897–1979), American football and basketball coach and educator
- John Eyler, author, academic and historian
- Larry Eyler (1952–1994), American serial killer
- Phil Eyler (born 1948), Canadian politician

== See also ==
- Eller (surname)
- Eylar, village in Iran
