= Musée de la Vie romantique =

Literary museum in Paris, France

Coordinates: 48.8809°N 2.3334°E

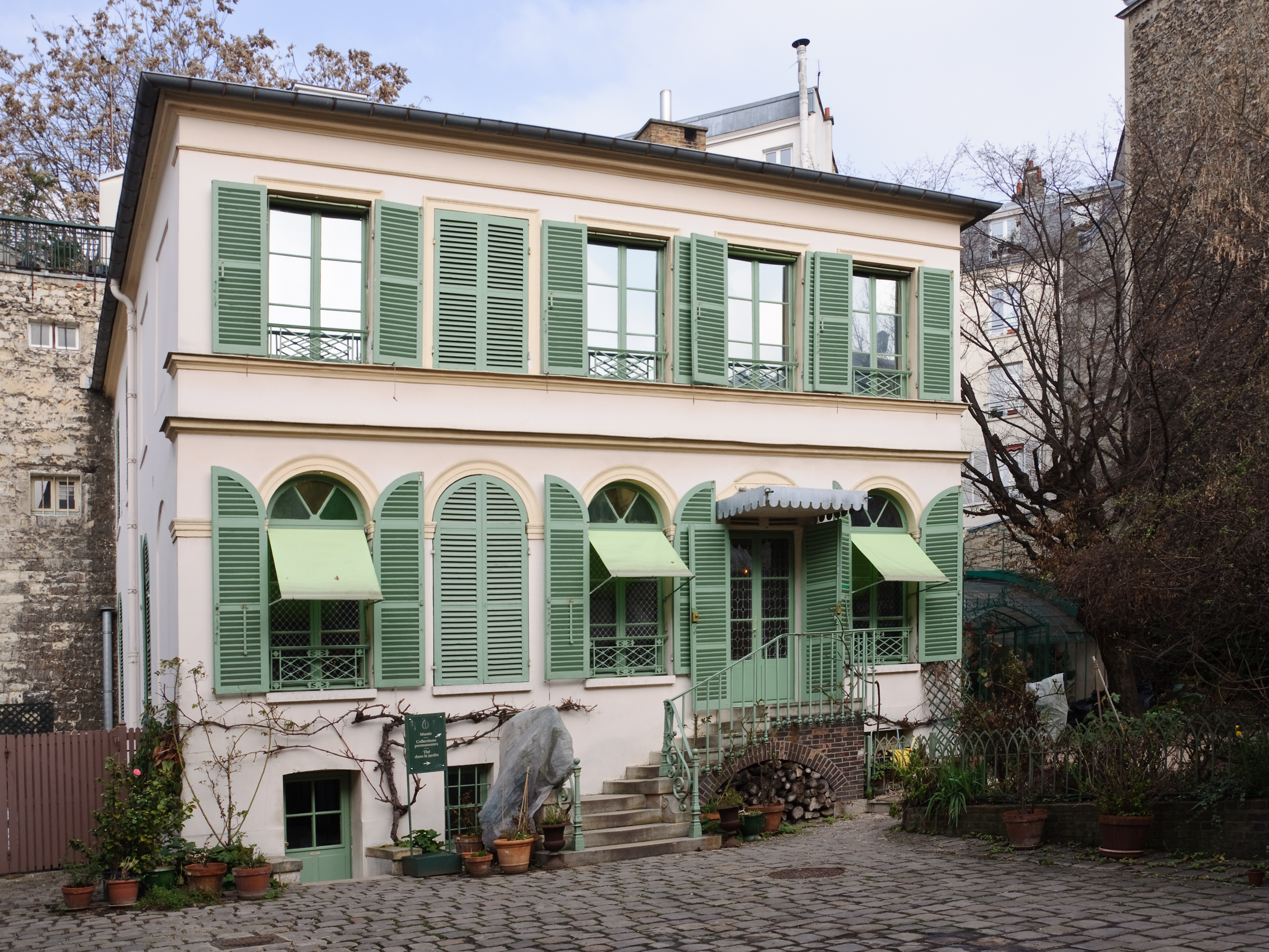
- Musée de la Vie romantique
- Established: 1987
- Location: Hôtel Scheffer-Renan, 16, Rue Chaptal, 75009, 9th arrondissement of Paris
- Website: Musée de la Vie romantique

The Musée de la Vie romantique (French pronunciation: [myze də la vi ʁɔmɑ̃tik], Museum of Romantic Life) is one of three literary museums in Paris (along with the Maison de Balzac and the Maison de Victor Hugo). It is located at the foot of Montmartre hill in the 9th arrondissement of Paris.

The Musée de la Vie romantique is one of the 14 Paris Musées that have been incorporated since January 1, 2013.

== Property ==
The main pavilion, an 1830s hôtel particulier, was the Paris base of the Dutch-born painter Ary Scheffer, one of the prominent artists of the time, close to King Louis-Philippe and his family. For decades, Scheffer and his daughter Cornélia hosted Friday-evening salons, among the most famous in La Nouvelle Athènes. George Sand used to come as a neighbour with Frédéric Chopin, meeting Eugène Delacroix, Jean-Auguste-Dominique Ingres, Alphonse de Lamartine, Franz Liszt, Gioacchino Rossini and singer Pauline Viardot. Later in the century, Charles Dickens, Ivan Turgueniev, and Charles Gounod attended regularly.

The property remained in private hands and passed by descent until 1982 when it became a museum, under the name of "Musée Renan-Scheffer". After an extensive renovation conducted by Jacques Garcia under the direction of Anne-Marie de Brem, it reopened in 1987 as "Musée de la Vie romantique". Daniel Marchesseau, conservateur général du Patrimoine, was appointed director in November 1998. For 13 years, he developed an ambitious program of exhibitions and acquisitions. Attendance has widely grown, from 18.000 visitors a year (1998) to 145.000 in 2010. He retired in winter 2013. His successor, Jérôme Farigoule, was appointed in September 2013.

== Collections ==
The Museum displays on the first floor numerous mementos of the romantic literary figure George Sand, including family portraits, household possessions, pieces of jewelry and memorabilia including plaster casts by Clésinger of the writer's sensuous right arm and Chopin's delicate left hand, plus a number of her own unique and rare watercolours called "dendrites".

On the second floor, one can admire a number of Romantic canvases, sculptures and objets d'art.

- Paintings by Ary Scheffer include portraits of Pauline Viardot, Queen Marie-Amélie, Princesse de Joinville, Princesse Marie d'Orléans, as well as oils of The Giaour (after Lord Byron), Faust and Marguerite (after Goethe), Effie and Jeanie Deans after The Heart of Midlothian by Walter Scott.
- Works by his contemporaries include François Bouchot (Maria Malibran), François Debon, Charles Durupt, Louis Hersent, Redouté, Camille Roqueplan.
- Sculptures are by Barre, Bartholdi, Théophile Bra (Mme Mention, bronze), Auguste Clésinger (Self-portrait and Portrait of George Sand, marble), Dantan, David d'Angers, Jean-Jacques Feuchère (Satan), François-Désiré Froment-Meurice, Théodore Gechter (Harold, bronze), Antonin Moine (Sully, bronze), Marie d'Orléans (La Chasse au faucon, I & 2, plaster, ca. 1835), James Pradier (Sappho, bronze), Christian Daniel Rauch (Goethe, bronze, 1820)...

The Museum also displays several portraits and material related to the famous scholar and writer Ernest Renan who had married Ary Scheffer's niece.

== Exhibitions and catalogues ==
1984

- La Nouvelle Athènes, by Dominique Morel

1985

- Achille Devéria, by Dominique Morel

1986

- Franz Liszt, by Dominique Morel

1988

- Lord Byron, by Anne-Marie de Brem & al.

1989

- Le Larmoyeur by Ary Scheffer, by Anne-Marie de Brem.

1990

- François Alexandre Pernot, by Denis Cailleaux.

1991

- Lamartine, by Anne-Marie de Brem & Marie-Renée Morin.

1992

- Ary Scheffer's Studio, by Anne-Marie de Brem.

1993

- Louis Hersent, by Anne-Marie de Brem.

1994

- Le Cliché-verre : Corot, Delacroix, Millet, Rousseau, Daubigny, by Alain Paviot.
- Jacques Chazot, by Pierre Bergé.

1995

- Georges Rouget, by Alain Pougetoux.

1996

- Ary Scheffer, by Leo Ewals.

1997

- Romantic Paintings from the Musée du Petit Palais, by Thérèse Burollet.

1998

- Alfred de Vigny, by Loïc Chotard.
- Enameled Lavas, by Georges Brunel.

1999

- Jean Marais, A Romantic Hero by Daniel Marchesseau. Contributions by Patrick Mauriès & Stéphane Ferrand.
- Sand – Musset / The Story of the Film : "Les Enfants du siècle", directed by Diane Kurys, with Juliette Binoche & Benoît Magimel (no catalogue).

2000

- French Romantic Jewelry (1820–1850), by Daniel Marchesseau. Contributions by Evelyne Possémé, Daniel Marchesseau, Isabelle Julia, Marie-Noëlle de Grandry, Diana Scarisbrick, Claudette Joannis & Pauline de Ayala.
- Sam Szafran, by Daniel Marchesseau, with an essay by Michel Le Bris.

2001

- French Romantic Drawings from Paris Private Collections, by Louis-Antoine Prat.
- Hungarian Photography, from Romanticism to Avant-Garde, by Daniel Marchesseau. Contributions by Catherine de Bourgoing, Anne Cartier-Bresson & Karoly Kincses.

2002

- André Malraux, by Solange Thierry. Contributions by Marc Lambron, Solange Thierry, Daniel Marchesseau, Pierre Cabanne, Antoine Terrasse, Christiane Moatti, Gilles Béguin and Germain Viatte.
- Martine Franck, Photographs, by Daniel Marchesseau, with an essay by Gérard Macé.
- Constantin Guys – Drawings from Musée Carnavalet and Petit Palais, by Daniel Marchesseau. Contributions by Claude Pichois, Daniel Marchesseau, Jérôme Dufilho, Christine Lancha, José de Los Llanos & John Richardson.

2003

- The François-Désiré Froment-Meurice Goldsmith Dynasty, by Daniel Marchesseau. Contributions by Ambassador Henri Froment-Maurice, Daniel Marchesseau, Anne Dion-Tenenbaum, Marc Bascou, Daniel Alcouffe, Fernando A. Martin, Marie-Madeleine Massé, Bernard Berthod, Nicole Garnier, Emmanuelle Toulet, Cécile Ullmann, Liliane Hamelin & Catherine de Bourgoing.
- Gustave Moreau – Works on paper from the Musée Gustave Moreau, by Marie-Cécile Forest and Daniel Marchesseau. Contributions by Jérôme Godeau, Marie-Cécile Forest, Luisa Capodieci, Raphael Rosenberg & Dominique Lobstein.

2004

- Impressionism and the Rouart Family, by Solange Thierry. Contributions by Daniel Marchesseau, Jean-Dominique Rey, Françoise Heilbrun, Anne Distel, Louis-Antoine Prat, Agathe Valéry-Rouart, Bertrand Marchal, Catherine de Bourgoing, Gabriel Rouart, Sophie Monneret, Dominique Bona, François Chapon & Jean-Marie Rouart.
- George Sand by Jérôme Godeau. Contributions by Diane de Margerie, Yves Gagneux, Françoise Heilbrun, Isabelle Leroy-Jay Lemaistre, Claude Samuel, Arlette Sérullaz, Vincent Pomarède, Nicole Savy & Martine Reid.

2005

- Richard Lindner Adults-Only , by Daniel Marchesseau. Contributions by Anouk Kopelman-Papadiamandis, Eduardo Arroyo, Judith Zilczer, Cécile Schenck, Alain Weill, Nicole Colin-Otto & Catherine de Bourgoing.
- The Braziliana Collection – Romantic Travelling Painters in Brazil by Daniel Marchesseau. Contributions by Marcelo Mattos Araujo, Carlos Martins, Daniel Marchesseau, Maria de Lourdes Eleutério, Valeria Piccoli, Jorge Coli, Luiz Dantas, Martine Bailleux-Delbecq & Xavier Dufestel.

2006

- Picasso-Crommelynck by Daniel Marchesseau. Contributions by Jean Clair, Werner Spies, Pietro Citati, Daniel Marchesseau, Piero Crommelynck, Ann Hindry, Dominique Dupuis-Labbé & Catherine de Bourgoing.
- Pierre Loti by Jérôme Godeau and Solange Thierry. Contributions by Claude Stéfani, Isabelle Collet, Christine Peltre, Catherine de Bourgoing, Arlette Sérullaz, Sophie Makariou, Olivier Gabet, Daniel Marchesseau & Emmanuelle Devos.

2007

- Théophile Bra by Daniel Marchesseau with contributions by Hubert Damisch, Daniel Marchesseau, Jacques de Caso, Pierre-Jacques Lamblin, Françoise Balligand, André Bigotte & Marie-Claude Sabouret.
- Jean-Jacques Henner, contributions by Daniel Marchesseau, Rodolphe Rapetti, Claire Bessède, Emilie Vanhaesebroucke, Isabelle Collet & Isabelle de Lannoy.

2008

- The Golden Age of German Romanticism – Watercolours and Drawings at the time of Goethe, by Hinrich Sieveking. Contributions by Pierre Rosenberg, Daniel Marchesseau & al.
- Ingres, Permanent Shadows – Drawings from Musée Ingres in Montauban, by Catherine Lépront.

2009

- Marc Riboud – 50 Years of Photography, by Daniel Marchesseau. Contributions by Jean Lacouture, Daniel Marchesseau, André Velter & Michel Frizot.
- William Blake by Michael Phillips. Contributions by Yves Bonnefoy, Michael Phillips, Daniel Marchesseau, Martin Butlin, Mark C. Crosby, David Alexander, Angus Whitehead, Elizabeth C. Denlinger, Robin Simon, Jon Stallworthy, Saree Makdisi, Jon Mee, Bethan Stevens, Andrew Lincoln, Jared Richman, Morton D. Paley, Martin Myrone, Andrew Loukes, Troy Patenaude, John Barrell, William L. Pressly, Martin Postle, Anthony Dyson, David Fuller, Suzanne R. Hoover, Céline Mansanti, David Steel & Peter France – An Exhibition organized by Musée de la Vie romantique, presented at Petit Palais / Musée des Beaux-Arts de la Ville de Paris (April–June 2009).
- The Grand Tour by French artists in Italy – Masterpieces from the Petit Palais Collections, 1600–1850. Contributions by Arnaud d'Hauterives, Daniel Marchesseau, Philippe Berthier, Sophie Renouard de Bussierre, Maryline Assante di Panzillo, Paulette Pelletier-Hornby, José de Los Llanos & Charles Villeneuve de Janti.

2010

- Frédéric Chopin, by Solange Thierry and Jérôme Godeau. Contributions by Solange Thierry, Jérôme Godeau, Jean-Jacques Eigeldinger, Yves Carlier, Martine Kaufmann, Frédérique Thomas-Maurin, Arlette Sérullaz, Pierre Vidal & Olivia Voisin.
- Romantic Russia, Masterpieces from the Tretyakov State Gallery, Moscow, by Daniel Marchesseau. Contributions by Dominique Fernandez, Daniel Marchesseau, Emmanuel Ducamp, Lidia Iovleva, Loudmila Markina, Irina Krasnikova & Anna Antonova.

2011

- French Romantic Gardens, by Catherine de Bourgoing. Contributions by Daniel Marchesseau, Didier Wirth, Claude d'Anthenaise, Monique Mosser, Elisabetta Cereghini, Patricia Taylor, Luigi Gallo, Pascale Heurtel, Bernard Chevallier, Dany Sautot, Jean-Denys Devauges & Isabelle Lévêque.
- Patrick Faigenbaum – Photographies – Paris proche et lointain, by Daniel Marchesseau & Jean-François Chevrier.

2012

- Theatres romantiques à Paris – Collections du musée Carnavalet, by Jean-Marie Bruson.
- Intérieurs romantiques – Watercolors 1820–1880 – The Eugene V. Thaw Gift to the Cooper Hewitt Museum, New York, by Gail Davidson, Charlotte Gere, Floramae Mc Carron-Cates & Daniel Marchesseau

== See also ==
- List of museums in Paris
