= Théophile Bra =

French sculptor

Théophile François Marcel Bra
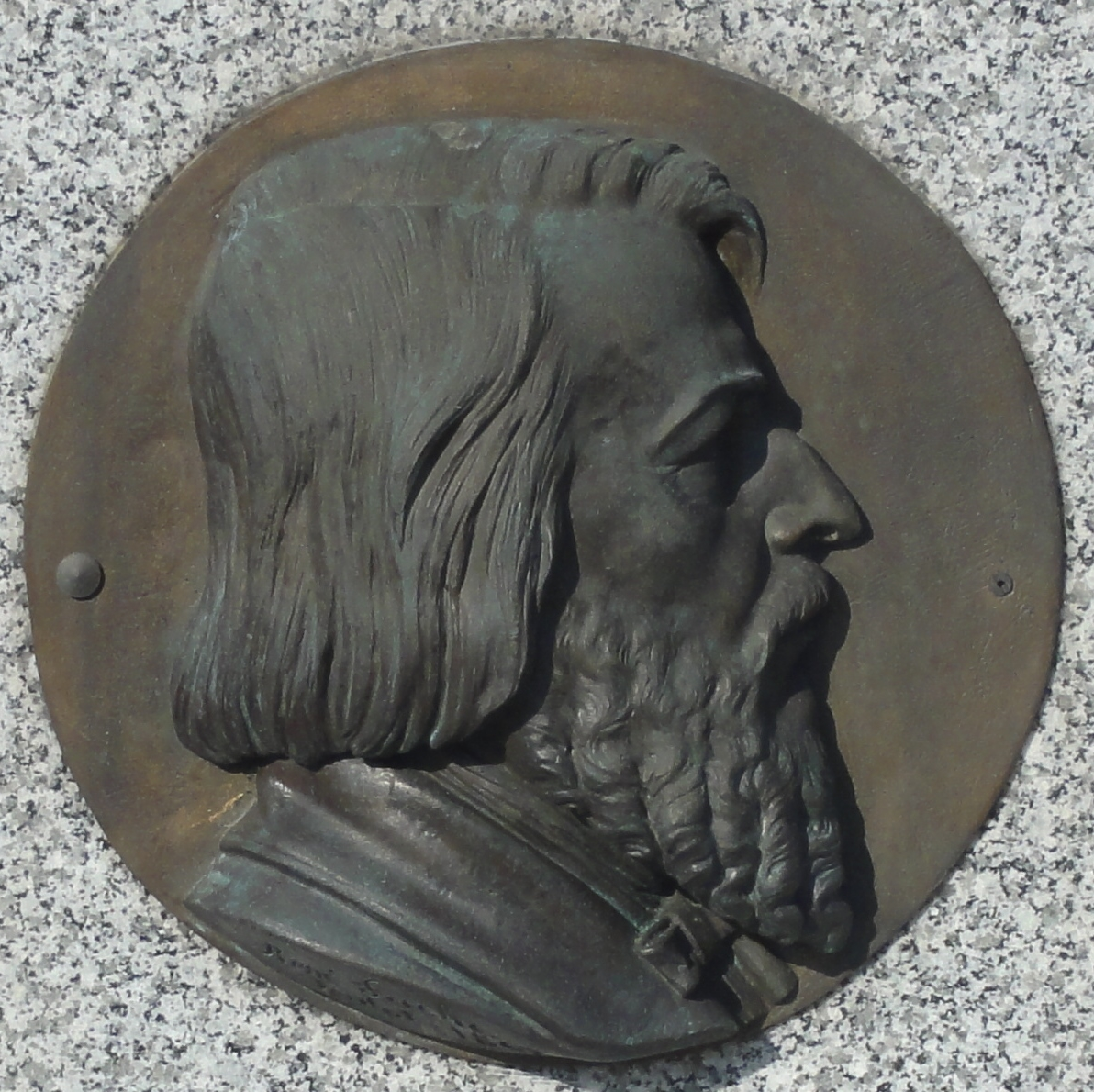
- Born: June 23, 1797; Douai
- Died: 1863
- Occupation: Sculptor

Théophile François Marcel Bra (23 June 1797, Douai - 1863) was a French Romantic sculptor and exact contemporary of Eugène Delacroix. He was deeply involved in the Romantic era through his uncompromising personality and complex spirituality. His fantastical inspiration evokes the universes inhabited by Goya, William Blake or Victor Hugo - he was at one and the same time a Bonapartist and an anglophile, a passionate Christian disciple of Swedenborg and an admirer of Judaism, Hinduism and Buddhism.

== Life ==
From a family that had been sculptors for four generations, Bra studied art in Paris. He won second prize in the Prix de Rome in 1818 and was made a Freemason in 1824 in Douai's "la Parfaite union" lodge. He also belonged to lodges in Paris, Lille and Douai between 1825 and 1840. He left his birthplace of Douai 100 boxes and albums of torrential writings, holding 5,000 drawings associated with the texts. Many sheets from this bequest, now kept in Douai's City Library, have been the subject of exhibitions in the United States and France, such as at Balzac's house, the Musée de la Chartreuse at Douai and the Musée de la vie romantique in Paris.

== Works ==
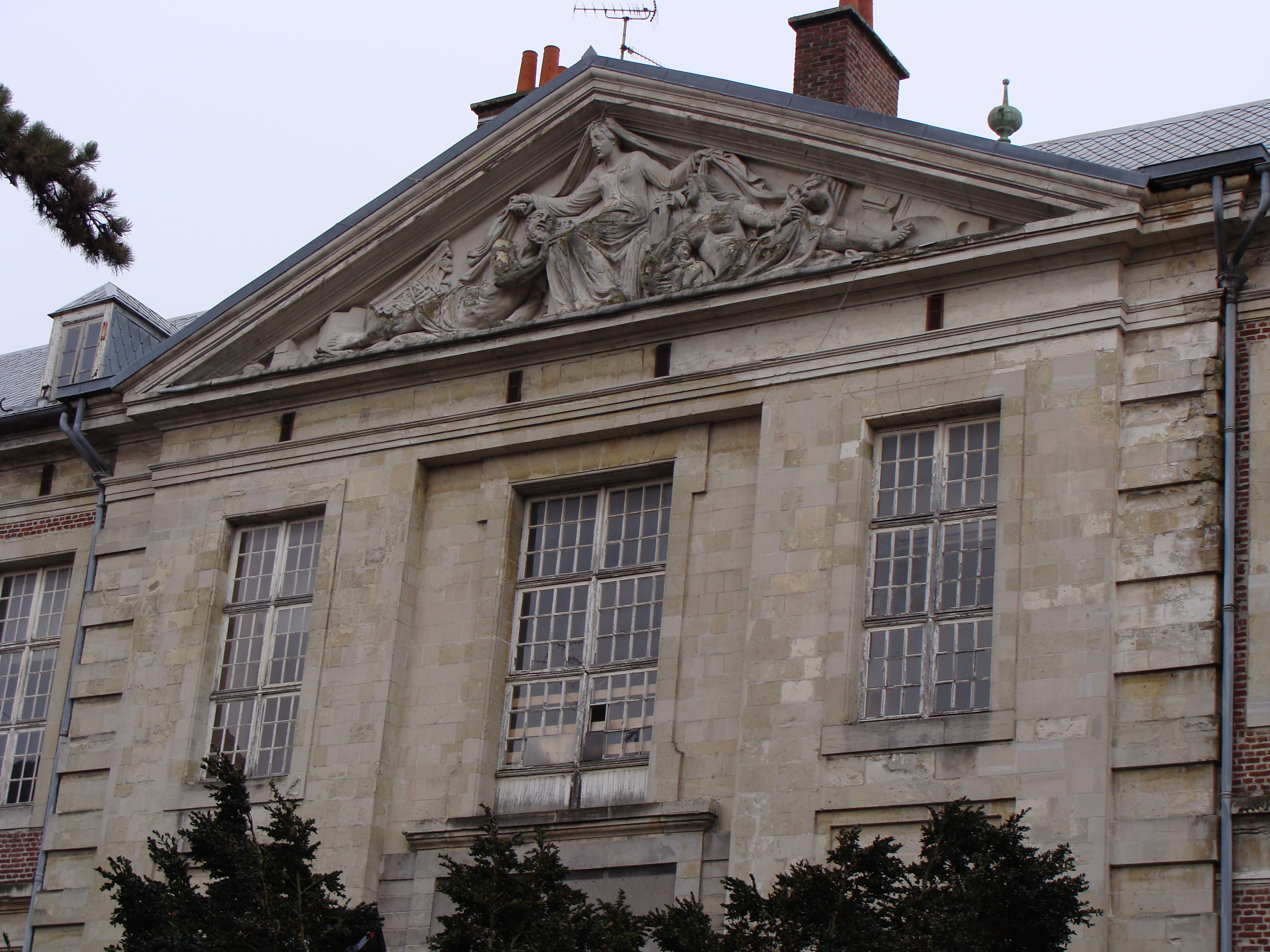
Pediment of the Hôpital-Général de Douai

His marble and plaster sculptures are numerous, in Douai's Musée de la Chartreuse, Paris churches and the museums at Versailles, Lille and Valenciennes, many of them being commissions under the Bourbon Restoration and July Monarchy. Others are to be seen on the Église de la Madeleine, Palais du Louvre and the Arc de Triomphe.

- Allegory of the besieged city of Lille, on the Column of the Goddess in Lille
- Christ on the cross and the Virgin and Child, at the église Sainte-Catherine in Lille
- Pediment of the Hôpital-Général de Douai
- Bust of Adolphe Édouard Casimir Joseph Mortier, Galerie des Batailles at the Château de Versailles
- Bust of Mme Mention, née Emilie Michel, bronze, Musée de la vie romantique, Paris.
- Statue of an androgynous angel, Musée de la Chartreuse de Douai, which inspired Balzac to create the character of conte Séraphita in one of his 1835 Études philosophiques in La Comédie humaine.
- Bronze statue of François Broussais, 1840, second courtyard of the Military Hospital at Val-de-Grâce.
- One of the bas-reliefs on the base of the Column of the Grande Armée, Wimille - 1840
- Bronze statue from the Column of the Goddess in the Place du Général-de-Gaulle, Lille.

== Publications ==
- The Drawing speaks: Théophile Bra: Works 1826–1855, Exhibition Catalogue, The Menil Collection, Houston, 1999, with contributions by Jacques de Caso, Hubert Damisch, André Bigotte.
- Théophile Bra, L'Evangile rouge, edited by Jacques de Caso, Paris, Gallimard, 2000.
- Sang d'encre - Théophile Bra, un illuminé romantique, Musée de la Vie romantique, Paris, 2007. Contributions by Jacques de Caso, Hubert Damisch, Pierre-Jacques Lamblin, Daniel Marchesseau, with Françoise Baligand, André Bigotte, Marie-Claude Sabouret.
