= C. Boyden Gray =

American lawyer (1943–2023)

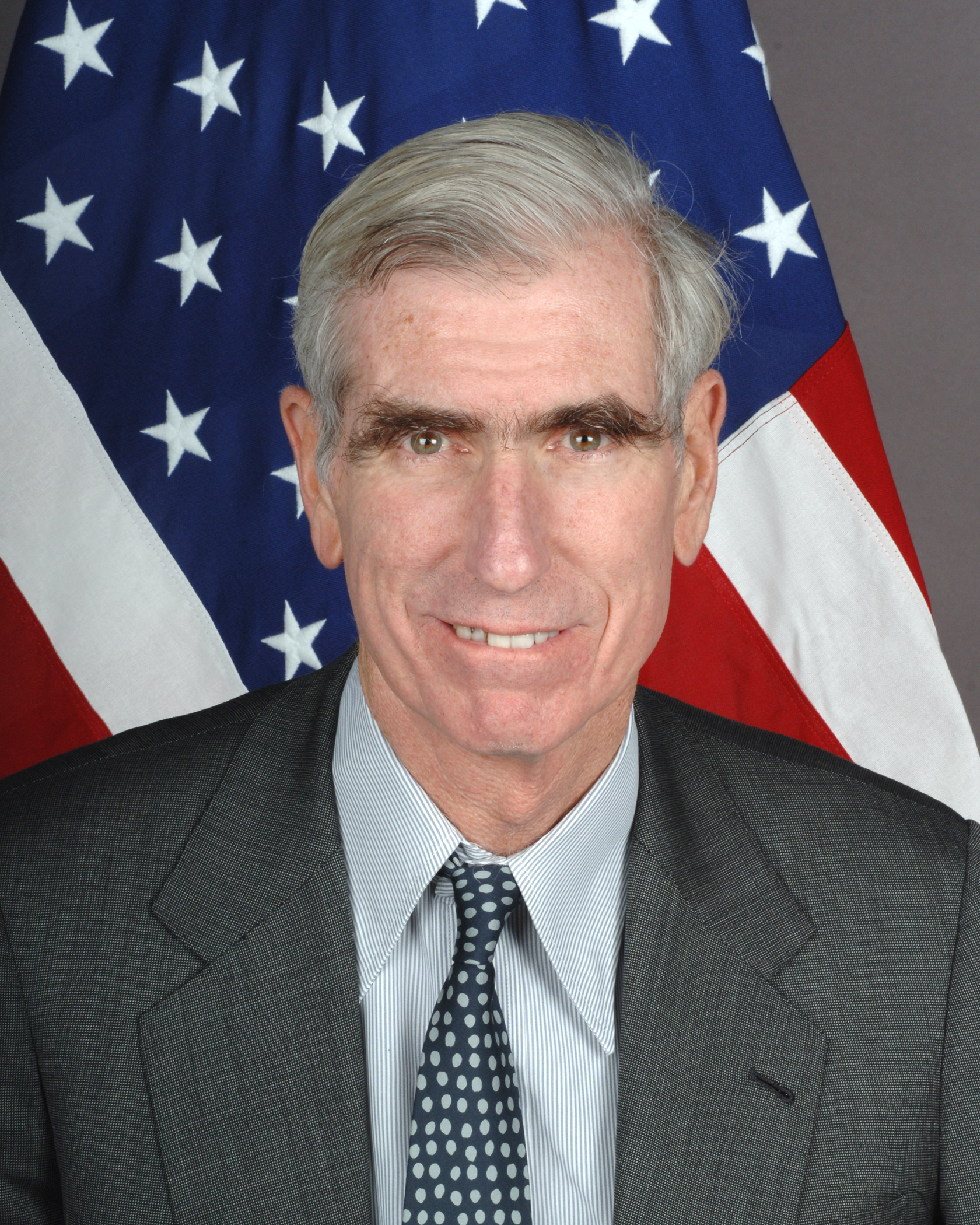
- Official portrait, 2006

United States Special Envoy for Eurasian Energy
- In office March 31, 2008 – January 20, 2009
- President: George W. Bush
- Preceded by: Position established
- Succeeded by: Richard Morningstar

United States Special Envoy for European Affairs
- In office January 11, 2008 – January 20, 2009
- President: George W. Bush
- Preceded by: Position established
- Succeeded by: Position abolished

United States Ambassador to the European Union
- In office January 20, 2006 – December 31, 2007
- President: George W. Bush
- Preceded by: Rockwell A. Schnabel
- Succeeded by: Kristen Silverberg

White House Counsel
- In office January 20, 1989 – January 20, 1993
- President: George H. W. Bush
- Preceded by: Arthur B. Culvahouse Jr.
- Succeeded by: Bernard Nussbaum

Personal details
- Born: Clayland Boyden Gray; February 6, 1943 Winston-Salem, North Carolina, U.S.
- Died: May 21, 2023 (aged 80) Washington, D.C., U.S.
- Party: Republican
- Spouse: Carol Taylor (m. 1984; div. 1998)
- Children: 1
- Parent: Gordon Gray (father)
- Relatives: Burton C. Gray (brother); Bowman Gray Sr. (grandfather); James A. Gray Jr. (grand-uncle)
- Education: Harvard University (BA); University of North Carolina, Chapel Hill (JD)

Clayland Boyden Gray (February 6, 1943 – May 21, 2023) was an American lawyer and diplomat who served as White House Counsel from 1989 to 1993 and as U.S. Ambassador to the European Union from 2006 to 2007. He was a founding partner of the Washington, D.C.–based law firm Boyden Gray & Associates LLP.

== Early life and education ==
Gray was born in Winston-Salem, North Carolina, on February 6, 1943. His father, Gordon Gray, was a lawyer who served as U.S. National Security Advisor under President Dwight D. Eisenhower. Gray's grandfather, Bowman Gray Sr., was the president of the R.J. Reynolds Tobacco Company.

Gray attended Fay School and St. Mark's School in Southborough, Massachusetts. He graduated magna cum laude from Harvard University in 1964, where he wrote for The Harvard Crimson. He also served as a sergeant in the United States Marine Corps Reserve from 1965 to 1970.

Gray then attended the University of North Carolina School of Law, where he served as editor-in-chief of the North Carolina Law Review and graduated with high honors in 1968.

== Career ==
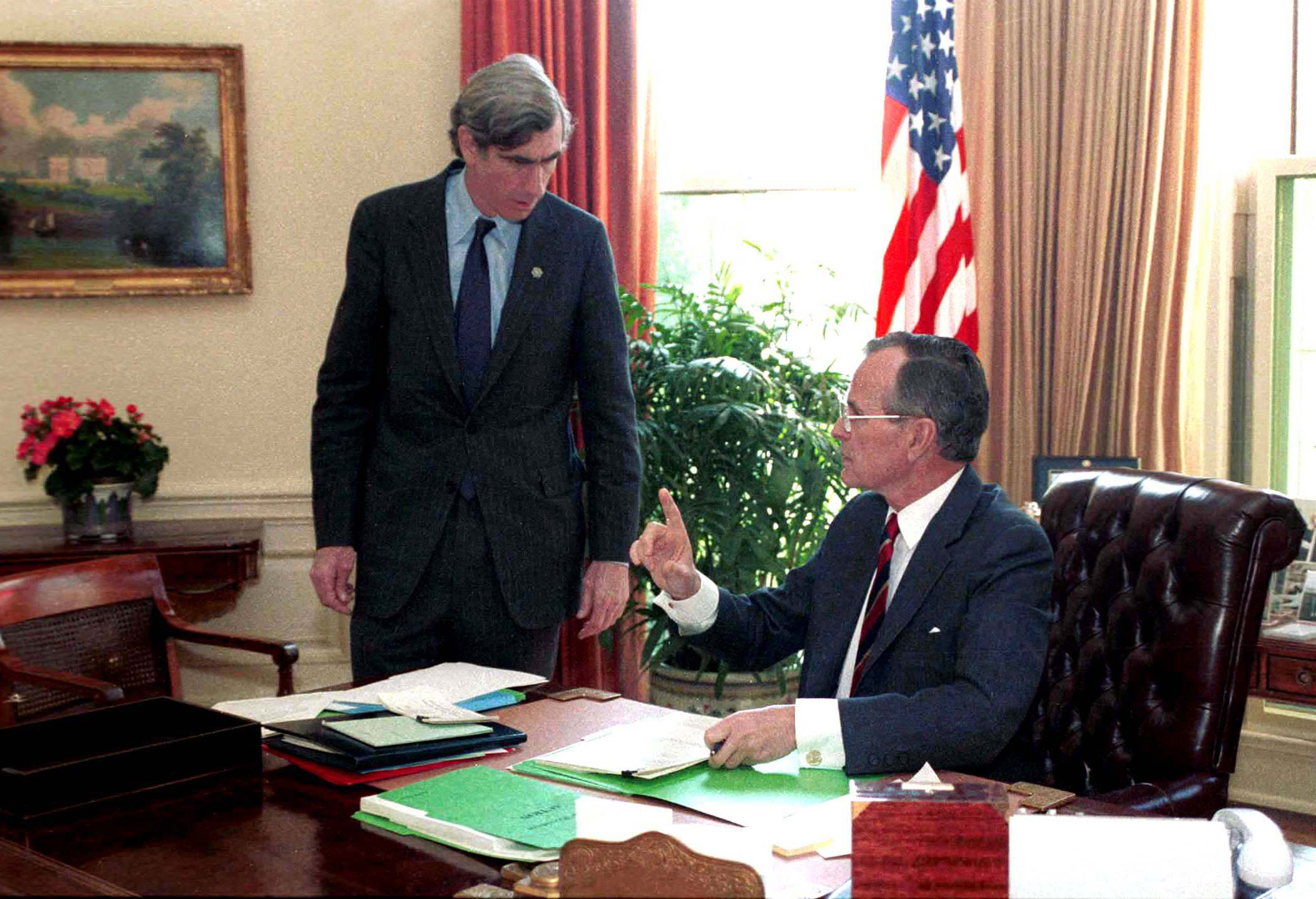
Gray with President George H. W. Bush in 1989

After graduation, Gray clerked for Supreme Court Chief Justice Earl Warren. In 1968, he joined the firm of Wilmer Cutler & Pickering (now Wilmer Cutler Pickering Hale and Dorr), and became a partner in 1976. Once a Democrat, Gray switched to the Republican Party by the end of the 1970s, due to his opposition to Jimmy Carter's presidency.

Gray took a leave of absence from the firm in 1981 to serve as legal counsel for Vice President George H. W. Bush. He also served as counsel to the Presidential Task Force on Regulatory Relief, chaired by Vice President Bush. Gray later served as Director of the Office of Transition Counsel for the Bush transition team, and as counsel to President Bush from 1989 to 1993. During this time, Gray became one of the main architects of the 1990 Clean Air Act Amendments that suggested market solutions for environmental problems. In 1993, Bush awarded him the Presidential Citizens Medal.

Gray returned to Wilmer Cutler & Pickering in 1993, where his practice focused on a range of regulatory matters with an emphasis on environmental issues, including those relating to biotechnology, trade, clean air, and the management of risk. He also served as chairman of the section of Administrative Law and Regulatory Practice of the American Bar Association. Gray also served as co-chairman with former Majority Leader Dick Armey of FreedomWorks.

Gray served on the Bush-Cheney Transition Department of Justice Advisory Committee. In 2002, he founded the Committee for Justice, a Washington, DC–based nonprofit dedicated to screening judicial and US Justice Department nominees.

In January 2006, President George W. Bush gave him a recess appointment as United States Ambassador to the European Union. He took a leave of absence from the law firm of Wilmer Cutler Pickering Hale and Dorr to accept that position. When Gray emerged as Bush's preferred candidate for the post of the United States' ambassador to the EU in July 2005, the potential nomination deeply perturbed open source advocates, who viewed his ties to Microsoft with suspicion.

Gray's last government position was as Special Envoy for European Affairs and Special Envoy for Eurasian Energy at the Mission of the United States to the European Union, having been nominated by United States Secretary of State Condoleezza Rice on January 11, 2008. On March 31, the White House announced his appointment to the additional post of Special Envoy for Eurasian Energy. He was a fundraiser for Donald Trump, the last Republican president of his lifetime, and was part of a legal team Trump formed after the 2020 United States presidential election.

According to Bob Woodward in his 2026 memoir Secrets, Gray was a confidential source for Woodward for years. Woodward also wrote that Gray leaked confidential documents to him about the Iran-Contra affair, which outright contradicted the Reagan administration’s public assertions about the scope of its involvement in the affair.

Gray was a member of the board of directors at the Atlantic Council, The European Institute, FreedomWorks, and America Abroad Media. In addition, Gray was also a member of the Federalist Society, Harvard University's Committee on University Development, the Board of Trustees of the Washington Scholarship Fund, St. Mark's School, and National Cathedral School.

== Personal life and death ==
Gray married Carol Taylor in 1984; they had a daughter and later divorced. He died from heart failure at his home in the Georgetown neighborhood of Washington, D.C., on May 21, 2023, at the age of 80.

== See also ==
- List of law clerks for the chief justice of the United States

Legal offices
Preceded by Arthur Culvahouse	White House Counsel; 1989–1993	Succeeded by Bernard Nussbaum
Diplomatic posts
Preceded by Rockwell A. Schnabel	United States Ambassador to the European Union; 2006–2007	Succeeded by Kristen Silverberg
New office	United States Special Envoy for Special Envoy for European Affairs; 2008–2009	Position abolished
New office	United States Special Envoy for Eurasian Energy; 2008–2009	Succeeded by Richard Morningstar
