= Herbert J. Herring =

Herbert James Herring (December 11, 1899 – September 23, 1966) was an American college dean.

Herring received his A.B. degree from Trinity College in 1922 and his M.A. degree from Columbia University in 1929. He also received his Doctor of Laws from Juniata College. Herring married Virginia Cozart, with whom he had two children: Virginia Frank Herring and Herbert J. Herring, Jr.

After teaching English in the R. J. Reynolds High School in Winston-Salem, Herring became Assistant Dean at Duke University in 1924. He subsequently became Dean of Men of Trinity College from 1935 to 1942, Dean of Trinity College until 1956, and Vice President of student life until retiring in 1964.

One of two Alumni Endowed Undergraduate Scholarships, awarded annually since 1979 by the Duke Alumni Association, is named in honor of Herring.
