= Earline Heath King =

American sculptor (1913–2011

Earline Heath King (May 11, 1913 – June 27, 2011) was an American singer and sculptor who specialized in portraits and statues. She is best known for her commissions and public art.

== Biography ==
King was an only child born in Winston-Salem. She showed artistic talent "early on" and become very involved in the arts at Richard J. Reynolds High School. King was married at age 16, to artist, Joe King. The two had been "childhood sweethearts," and eloped to Virginia. For some time they kept the marriage secret and when it was found out, he moved into her home. King went on to attend Greensboro College on scholarship for music. After a vacation to Washington D.C., they moved there, settling in Virginia Heights in 1935. She and her husband performed in vaudeville, where she worked as a singer. They also performed in USO shows for the Navy. King was a mezzo-soprano. In 1946, the couple moved back to Winston-Salem.

King began sculpting in the mid-1960s as a hobby after one of her friends talked her into taking classes at a community center. Throughout her 43-year career, she created 345 sculptures by commission. She also created a large number of public art sculptures.

King and Joe were divorced in 1981.

King was very involved in the community in various organizations and in 1997, became the first woman president of the Twin City Club. In 2003, she was awarded the Order of the Long Leaf Pine by North Carolina Governor Mike Easley.

== Work ==
In 1974, she released a book called Sculpture. She was commissioned to create a bust of Armand Hammer for the Salk Institute in 1976. Her first public artwork was unveiled in 1979 which was an equestrian statue of R.J. Reynolds and is located in Winston-Salem. King held a one-woman show at the Galleria Luigi Bellini in Florence in 1993. In 1996, she created a sculpture for Grace Court Park of Barbara Smitherman, a local parks enthusiast. In 2001, she sculpted a statue of Bowman Gray for the Wake Forest School of Medicine.

King signed her work with the initials, "HK." She also taught sculpture for 23 years.
