= François-Désiré Froment-Meurice =

François-Désiré Froment-Meurice (31 December 1802 — 17 February 1855) was a French goldsmith, working in a free and naturalistic manner in the tradition of Mannerist and Baroque masters. One version of his Coupe des Vendanges, the "Harvest Cup", made in 1844, is conserved at the Musée du Louvre.

== Biography ==
Born in Paris to a goldsmith of moderate reputation, François Froment (1773–1803), he was soon left fatherless. His mother remarried another jeweller, Pierre Meurice. François-Désiré Froment, who took his stepfather's name, having graduated from the Lycée Charlemagne was apprenticed as a ciseleur, or chaser, and developed his own renown. He took up the family workshop from 1832, with such success that he obtained two silver medals at the 1839 Exposition des produits de l'industrie— which gained him the appointment as orfèvre-joailler to the city of Paris— and a gold medal in the French Industrial Exposition of 1844. From 1849, he exhibited successfully in London and thenceforth across Europe.

Froment-Meurice’s work in jewelry design was marked by a Romantic style that embraced neo-Gothic and Renaissance elements. As a leader in the Romantic jewelry movement, he crafted intricate pieces depicting Gothic-inspired figures, such as armored knights, lords and ladies in period costume, angels, and saints, often set within elaborate frames enriched by polychrome enamel. His designs, influenced by Mannerist and Baroque traditions, emphasized a sculptural approach and aligned with the Romantic era’s fascination with historical and chivalric themes, appealing to a taste for medieval elegance.

Established near the Hôtel de Ville de Paris in 1828, he removed to the quartier of the Madeleine after 1848; during the revolutions of that year he served in the city's platoon of the Garde nationale. Under the Second Empire he maintained his showrooms at 50, rue du faubourg Saint-Honoré.

Victor Hugo wrote a poem celebrating the ciseleur 's art that commences:

Nous sommes frères : la fleur

Par deux arts peut être faite.
Le poète est ciseleur;

Le ciseleur est poëte.

In his appointment to the city of Paris he was responsible for the ceremonial cradle (berceau d’apparat) offered by Paris at the birth of the Prince Impérial Eugène-Louis Napoléon (1856), conserved at the Musée Carnavalet. In a semi-official commission, he produced a spectacular, fully equipped toilette for the duchess of Parma (1855–58), now at the Musée d'Orsay; it was commissioned in 1845 by a subscription circulated among Legitimist ladies of France for the marriage of Louise-Thérèse de Bourbon, granddaughter of Charles X, with the future duke Charles III of Parma. It was completed in time to be included in the Great Exhibition, London, 1851. Among his private clients were writers and dandies, like Honoré de Balzac and the fastidious Théophile Gautier. For Balzac Froment-Meurice executed a canne aux singes ("Monkey Tankard") designed by the sculptor Pierre-Jules Cavelier, which Balzac presented to his brother-in-law Georges Mniszech; it bears the portrait of the comtesse Hanska. For the connoisseur-collector the duc de Luynes, he carried out a table of repoussé silver.

Froment-Meurice died in Paris at the peak of his fame before the opening of the Exposition Universelle of 1855.

== Family ==
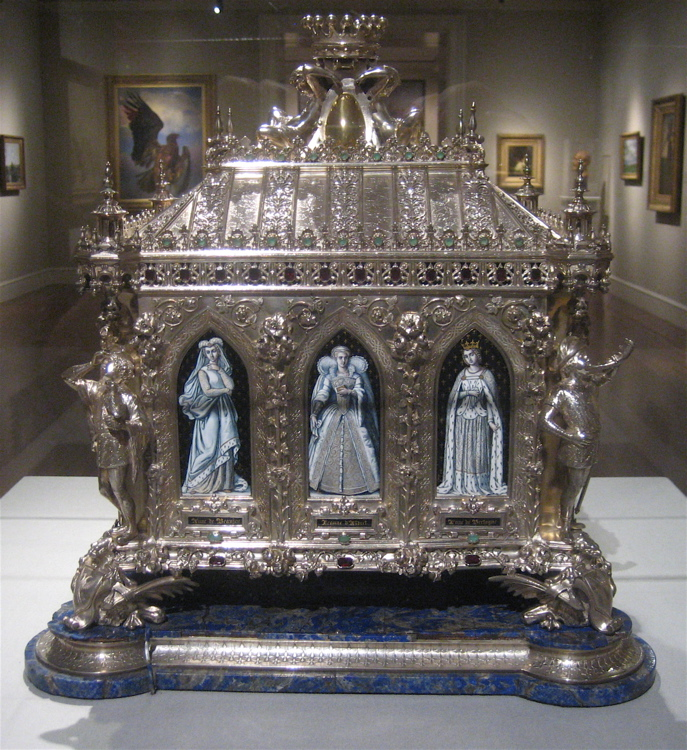
Casket (1867) by Émile Froment-Meurice in collaboration with Félix Duban (LACMA)

His son Émile Froment-Meurice (1837–1913), after some tentative beginnings, carried on the family atelier until 1913. At the Exposition Universelle (1867) the Maison Froment-Meurice exhibited a monumental sculptural overmantel for the Hôtel de Ville, that was lost in the fire that consumed the building during the Paris Commune of 1870. The Paris Tiara, given to Pope Leo XIII by the people of Paris in 1888 to commemorate his Golden Jubilee as a priest, was designed and executed by the younger Froment-Meurice.

== Legacy ==
An exhibition, Les Froment-Meurice, Orfèvres romantiques parisiens, was presented by the Musée de la Vie romantique, Paris, in 2003; the museum conserves Froment-Meurice's silver box made to contain the epaulettes of General Louis Eugène Cavaignac.
