= Jack Keenan (American football) =

American football player (1919–1977)

- Keenan in 1946

No. 47
- Position: Guard

Personal information
- Born: June 8, 1919; Greensboro, North Carolina, U.S.
- Died: February 8, 1977 (aged 57); Rocky Mount, North Carolina, U.S.
- Listed height: 5 ft 10 in (1.78 m)
- Listed weight: 214 lb (97 kg)

Career information
- High school: R. J. Reynolds (Winston-Salem, North Carolina)
- College: South Carolina

Career history
- 1944–1945: Washington Redskins

Career statistics
- Games played: 13
- Games started: 3
- Stats at Pro Football Reference

Jack Harvey Keenan (June 8, 1919 – February 8, 1977) was an American football guard who played collegiately for University of South Carolina and in the National Football League (NFL) for the Washington Redskins. His professional football career was put on hold by the outbreak of World War II. After the war, Keenan resumed his career briefly with the Hawaiian Warriors of the Pacific Coast Professional Football League.

== Biography ==
Jack Keenan was born June 8, 1919, in Greensboro, North Carolina. He attended R. J. Reynolds High School where he excelled in football. After graduation he attended the University of South Carolina, playing as a lineman on the South Carolina Gamecocks football team.

Keenan looks at the contract offered by the Los Angeles Dons for the 1946 season.

Keenan played for the Washington Redskins of the National Football League (NFL) during the 1944 and 1945 NFL seasons, seeing action in 13 games.

Keenan served as a lieutenant in the US Army during World War II. After the end of the war he attempted to renew his professional football career as a member of the Los Angeles Dons of the All-America Football Conference, but he was released from the team shortly before the start of the season.

After his release from the Dons, Keenan signed on with the Hawaiian Warriors of the Pacific Coast Professional Football League (PCPFL), for whom he played in 1946 and 1947. The Warriors were the semi-professional farm team of the Dons and were coached by Keith Molesworth, later head coach of the Baltimore Colts. While with the Warriors Keenan played center and served as an assistant line coach. During summers ahead of the season, Keenan stayed in shape by working as a life guard at Myrtle Beach, South Carolina.

After his playing career ended he returned home to North Carolina where he was a football coach and assistant to the athletic director at Alexander Graham Junior High School in Charlotte. He also played semi-professional football for the Charlotte Clippers in 1949.

He later worked for a number years in a wrecking yard.

Keenan was pronounced dead on arrival after transport to General Hospital at Rocky Mount, North Carolina, on February 8, 1977. He was 57 years old at the time of his death.
