= Jacques de Caso =

Jacques de Caso (born September 28, 1928) is a French-born American historian who specializes in the literature and history of pre-modern art in Europe, principally late eighteenth- and nineteenth-century French and German neo-classicism and Romanticism.

== Education ==
Educated in part by his post-surrealist associations after World War II (he was among the intimates of Hans Bellmer), he studied humanities at Free University of Berlin and then studied art history at the Sorbonne and at Yale, which awarded him a Ph.D. in 1962. He held the Henri Focillon Fellowship in France (1959) and received a John Simon Guggenheim Fellowship in the United States in 1972. He subsequently held a fellowship at the Centre national de la recherche scientifique, Paris.

== Teaching career ==
De Caso taught the history and the literature of Western art of the 18th and 19th centuries, both in the United States at the University of Chicago Graduate School (1962–1965), as invited professor at Harvard (1975-1976 academic year), as professor at the University of California, Berkeley (1965-2000), and in Europe as invited professor at the Collège de France, Paris (1981–1982).

== Research ==
De Caso is best known for his fundamental contributions to the history of European sculpture in most of its aspects from the end of the 18th century to the beginning of the 20th. His work has also involved French neo-classical painting (Jacques-Louis David in particular) and thought and theory concerning art in France 1800-1900.

He assisted Baron Philippe de Rothschild and Baroness de Rothschild during the early stages of their acquisition and study of art objects prior to Baron Philippe's creation of the private Wine Art Museum (musée privé du vin dans l’art), 1962, at Château Mouton-Rothschild, Pauillac, France.

He is an authority on the works of David (d'Angers) whose unpublished writings he is editing for publication. With Jean-Luc Marais he has completed a critical edition of Victor Pavie's newly discovered letters to David d'Angers. Together with Patricia Sanders he conducted a re-appraisal of the Rodin collection at the California Palace of the Legion of Honor and with Sanders produced a newly translated and annotated edition of Rodin's book Art.

He was instrumental in the re-discovery of James Pradier and discovered the drawings and writings of the previously little-known sculptor Théophile Bra. With Sylvain Bellenger, he organized for the Musée Historial de la Vendée and the Musée d'Orsay in Paris the first retrospective exhibition dedicated to Félicie de Fauveau, the sculptor Stendhal discovered and praised.

With Petra ten-Doesschate Chu, he served as editor of the Princeton University Press series in 19th Century Art, Culture & Society.

The exhibit "Metamorphoses in Nineteenth Century Sculpture" which he organized with Jane Wasserman at the Fogg Museum, Harvard, pioneered the recognition and study of serial sculpture—industrial production of sculptural works in various scales, materials, etc.-- and all it implied in terms of art, society and economics.

He has donated his library and his extensive visual archives to the School of Art and Art History, University of Iowa.

De Caso has regularly indulged his interests in other fields as well. These range from translating the writing of Tatjana Gsovsky on ballet in post-World War II Germany to collaborating with James Norwood Pratt on The Wine Bibber's Bible, the first book-length appraisal of California's wines
