= A Short History of a Small Place =

1985 novel by T. R. Pearson

- First edition
- Author: T. R. Pearson
- Language: English
- Publisher: Simon & Schuster
- Publication date: 1985
- Publication place: United States
- Media type: Print (Hardcover)
- Pages: 381 pp
- ISBN: 0-671-54352-0
- OCLC: 11599872
- Dewey Decimal: 813/.54 19
- LC Class: PS3566.E235 S5 1985
- Followed by: Off for the Sweet Hereafter

A Short History of a Small Place is a 1985 novel by T. R. Pearson. It describes the lives and eccentricities of the inhabitants of the fictional town of Neely, North Carolina.

The book is Pearson's first novel. It is told from the point of view of a young boy, Louis Benfield. It focuses on the fates of the Pettigrew family, and particularly Myra Angelique Pettigrew, a Miss Haversham figure, who has withdrawn from society after a failed love affair, and lives with only a chimpanzee named Mr Britches for companion.

Neely has been identified by some readers as a thinly disguised Reidsville and was also the setting for Pearson's second book, Off for the Sweet Hereafter.

== Reception ==
The Independent described it as "an entertaining, innocuous, at times witty and at times trite novel which, happily bouncing its way from episode to episode, barely ever strikes a false note and hardly ever rings a true one".

Kirkus Reviews described the novel as a "colorful, often amusing, but ultimately frustratingly episodic novel", noting that it shows "a strong sense of place, a fine ear for speech, a confident, old-fashioned way of storytelling, and a subtle, disarming humor".
