= Stuart Epperson =

American businessman, Founder of Salem Media Group (1936 – 2023)

- Born: November 2, 1936; Patrick County, Virginia, U.S.
- Died: July 17, 2023 (aged 86)
- Education: Bob Jones University
- Occupation: Businessman
- Employer: Salem Media Group
- Political party: Republican
- Spouse: Nancy Atsigner (m. 1963)

Stuart (Stu) Watson Epperson (November 2, 1936 – July 17, 2023) was an American businessman and politician who was the co-founder and chairman of Salem Media Group and a member and the president of the conservative Council for National Policy ("CNP").

== Early life ==
The youngest of six children, Epperson was born on November 2, 1936, in Ararat, Virginia, to Harry and Lula Epperson, with his paternal grandmother serving as the midwife. Epperson was raised in a shanty with no electricity or running water on a tobacco farm. To supplement their income, his family worked odd jobs, working as carpenters, dentists, and morticians. Epperson's family attended Unity Presbyterian Church, a fundamentalist church whose building was constructed from wood hewn by his family.

When Epperson was eight years old, his older brother Ralph became interested in radio broadcasting, setting up a windmill to generate electricity and convincing his parents to buy a radio set from Montgomery Ward. Ralph then set up a radio station on the second floor of the family farmhouse. One of Epperson's first radio appearances might have been reading Psalm 23 for Ralph's radio broadcasts. Soon thereafter, his father put the tobacco farm up for collateral and started three radio stations with the loan he took out. Epperson was very involved in his family's business, working for Ralph's radio station in Airy.

At the behest of his parents, Epperson attended Bob Jones University in Greenville, South Carolina, where he received a bachelor's degree in radio/television broadcasting in 1956 and a master's degree in communications in 1959. While in college, he met his future wife, Nancy Atsinger, and married her in 1963.

== Career ==
Epperson acquired his first radio station in Roanoke, Virginia, in 1961. The radio station played country music and sermons from various local pastors. In 1964, he moved to Winston-Salem, North Carolina. There, he bought the radio station WXBX, which followed a similar format to the radio station in Roanoke. The radio station had a small staff and was run out of a shanty rented for $95 a month from a widowed woman named Erline Tate. Epperson's radio station in Winston-Salem ran afoul of the government in 1970 when the US Labor Department fined him for insufficiently paying his employees overtime. The Federal Communications Commission also fined Epperson the maximum amount of money for not keeping proper business records. In 1976, he sold the station.

In 1984 and 1986, Epperson was the Republican nominee for North Carolina's 5th congressional district. Epperson had no prior political experience and spent most of his first campaign trying to gain attention. In both races, Epperson was defeated by the incumbent Democrat, Stephen L. Neal, falling short 5,000 and 13,000 votes respectively.

=== Salem Media Group ===
Epperson co-founded Salem Communications (now called Salem Media Group) in 1974 with his brother-in-law, Edward G. Atsinger III, and oversaw its major expansion in hundreds of radio markets nationwide. After losing to Stephen L. Neal in the 1986 election, Epperson shifted his focus back to radio. Salem Media Group acquired a radio station in Bakersfield, California, and later acquired the Oxnard, California, radio station KDAR in 1986. He later oversaw its inclusion of conservative political opinion programming starting in 1990. Through his involvement in that entity, he was a member of the board of directors of the National Religious Broadcasters Association. Time Magazine has named him one of the 25 most influential evangelicals in America.

=== Personal life ===
His wife, Nancy, is on the board of international Christian broadcaster Trans World Radio (TWR). He had four children, daughters Kristy, Karen, and Kathy, and son Stuart Jr. Stuart Epperson died in July 2023, at the age of 86.
