= Hôpital-Général de Douai =

Hospital in Douai, France

Coordinates: 50°22′04″N 3°05′11″E

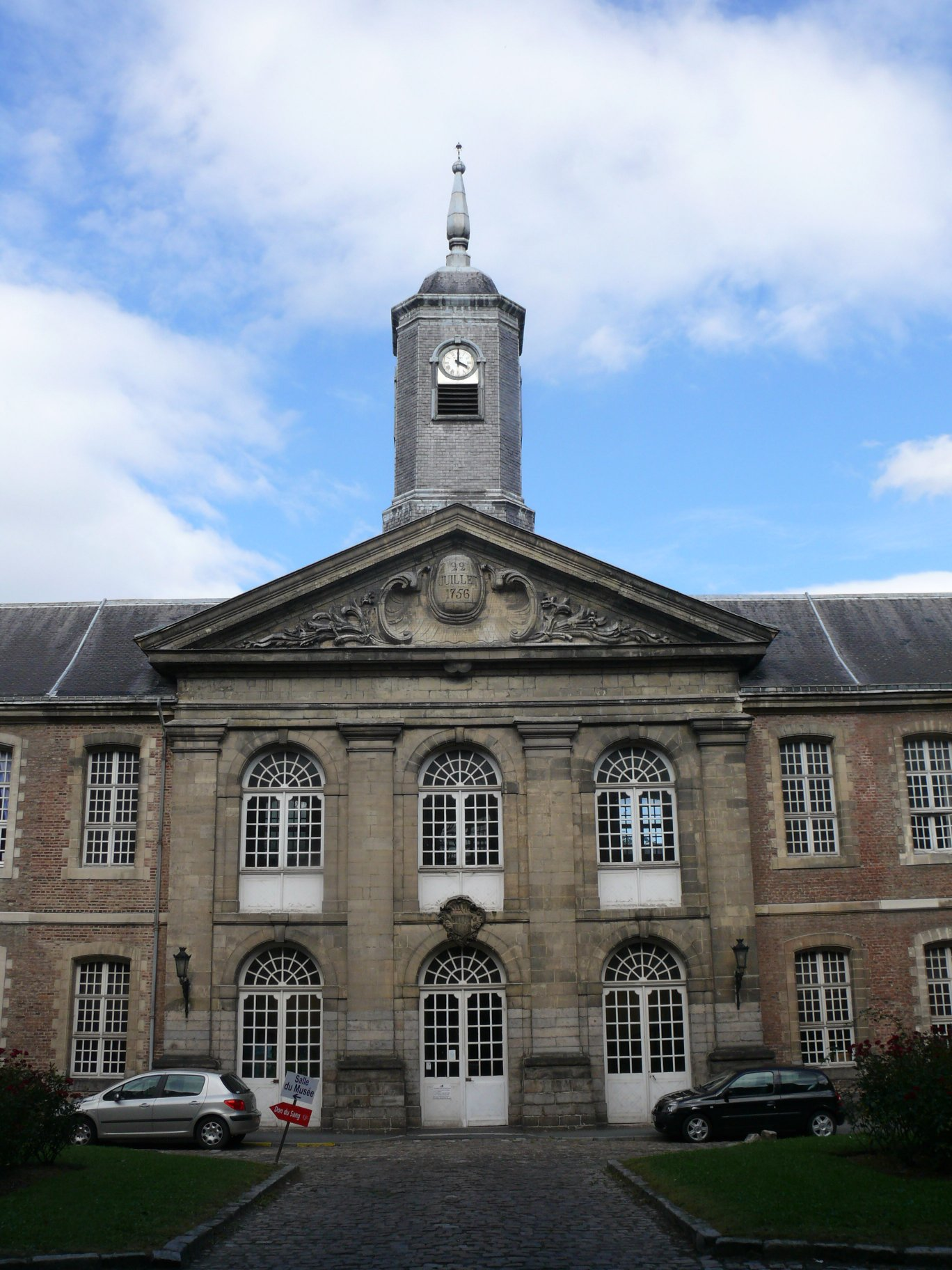
The hospital seen in 2011.

The Hôpital-Général de Douai was set up in 1752 in the French city of Douai.

The hospital is an important healthcare establishment in the Douaisis area . It carries out its public hospital service missions covering 64 municipalities with a population of nearly 260,000 inhabitants.

It has a capacity of 874 beds and 50,000 people get treatment at the hospital every year.

It is also a major employer in the region, employing 2,300 people.
