= Vernon Rudolph =

American businessman and the founder of Krispy Kreme

- Born: Vernon Carver Rudolph; June 30, 1915; Marshall County, Kentucky, U.S.
- Died: August 16, 1973 (aged 58); Winston-Salem, North Carolina, U.S.
- Occupation: Businessman
- Known for: Founder of Krispy Kreme Doughnuts, Inc.
- Spouse(s): Ruth Ayers (m. 1939; died 1944) Lorraine Flynt (m. 1946)
- Children: 4
- Relatives: Lewis Rudolph (brother)

Vernon Carver Rudolph (June 30, 1915 – August 16, 1973) was an American businessman who founded Krispy Kreme Doughnuts, Inc.

== Early life ==
Vernon Carver Rudolph was born in Marshall County, Kentucky. He was the oldest of four children born to Plumie and Rethie Rudolph. His siblings included Lewis Rudolph, who would later help found Krispy Kreme. As he grew older, Vernon Rudolph began to help in the general store that his uncle owned.

== Career ==
When he graduated high school, he went to Paducah, Kentucky, with his uncle. In 1933, Rudolph's uncle bought a doughnut shop and recipe for yeast-raised donuts from a French federal employee and chef named Joe LeBeau. This all occurred during the middle of the Great Depression, so they moved to Nashville, Tennessee, to see if they could get better business there and secure their financial future. Things did not work out for them in Nashville, so they moved back to Kentucky where Rudolph's uncle sold his business to his brother, Rudolph's father. His son, Lewis, started working for the shop. In 1936. his father opened another shop in Charleston, West Virginia, and a few years later, a third shop in Atlanta, Georgia.

In the summer of 1937, determined to own his own Krispy Kreme shop, Rudolph decided to move to Winston-Salem, North Carolina, rented a building across from Salem College and Academy, and on July 13, 1937, using the original Krispy Kreme recipe, opened his shop. His first customers were local grocery stores, but people began to stop by the store asking if they could buy hot doughnuts. In the 1940s, he sold franchises and in 1947, he founded the Krispy Kreme Corporation, becoming Chairman and President.

== Personal life ==
In 1939, he married Ruth Ayers, who was from Atlanta, Georgia. They adopted a baby girl, Patricia Ann, in 1943. In 1944, his wife died in a car accident in Orangeburg, South Carolina. In 1946, he remarried to Lorraine Flynt of Winston-Salem, NC. They had four children.

== Death ==
Rudolph died on August 16, 1973, in Winston-Salem, North Carolina at the age of 58.
