= Roxie Nicholson =

- Born: August 5, 1950; Winston-Salem, North Carolina
- Education: BA and MA, PhdUniversity of North Carolina and University of Maryland

Roxie Nicholson is a policy analyst who worked for much of her career at the United States Department of Labor. She retired in 2014. She is considered an expert on welfare policy and has often been quoted by The New York Times, The Washington Post, The Weekly Standard, The Wall Street Journal, The Boston Globe, and other media on welfare to work and poverty issues. She is best known for her critique of welfare reform efforts in the 1990s which she claimed would eventually lead to more childhood poverty and underfunded block grants to states. She has been a contributor to numerous evaluations of welfare policy in the United States.
