= Lewis Rudolph =

American businessman, Co-Founder of Krispy Kreme, brother of Vernon Rudolph

William Lewis Rudolph (December 6, 1919 – December 28, 2014) was an American businessman who helped to co-found the Krispy Kreme doughnut company with his brother, Vernon Rudolph, during the 1930s. He also helped open the first Krispy Kreme in Nashville, Tennessee. Lewis Rudolph later served as Vice President of Krispy Kreme, while Vernon Rudolph served as president and CEO of the company.

Lewis Rudolph was born on December 6, 1919, in Marshall County, Kentucky. He was one of four children born to Rethie and Plumie Rudolph. His father, Plumie, operated a general store in Marshall County.

In the early 1930s, Lewis Rudolph's uncle, Ishmael Armstrong, and his brother, Vernon, who was 18 years old at the time, began a yeast doughnut, based on a recipe they had received from a chef from New Orleans. However, the economic downturn during the Great Depression caused financial difficulties for both Plumie Rudolph's general store and Vernon Rudolph's doughnut business. The entire family relocated to Nashville to pursue better financial opportunities. Lewis Rudolph's father, Plumie, soon purchased Ishmael Armstrong's doughnut business from him.

Lewis Rudolph dropped out of high school to work at the family doughnut business. He spent days mixing ingredients by hand. The doughnut shop proved successful and the family was able to expand to new shops in Charleston, West Virginia, and Atlanta, Georgia. In 1937, Vernon Rudolph established Krispy Kreme doughnuts at a new location in Winston-Salem, North Carolina. He had decided to open the first Krispy Kreme in Winston-Salem due to the presence of Camel cigarettes in the city.

Lewis Rudolph married Jeanne Marie Fisher, a Nashville native, in 1937, the same year that his brother opened the first branded Krispy Kreme location in North Carolina. The chain continued to expand throughout the 1940s. By the time Krispy Kreme was incorporated as a company in 1947, there were eight shops in the Southeast United States. Lewis Rudolph became Vice President of Krispy Kreme, while Vernon served as president and CEO.

Lewis Rudolph moved back to Nashville from Winston-Salem in 1959 in order to acquire the city's two Krispy Kreme locations. He continued to work at Krispy Kreme for the next 48 years, until his retirement in 1985. Rudolph opened two additional Krispy Kreme franchise locations in Nashville during the 1960s – one was located on Thompson Lane, while the other was located on West End Avenue.

Vernon Rudolph, his brother and Krispy Kreme's founder, died in 1973. In 1976, Krispy Kreme merged with Beatrice Foods of Chicago. By the early 1980s, sales at Krispy Kreme were in decline. In 1983, Lewis Rudolph, together with other franchisees, organized a buyout of the doughnut company. Lewis Rudolph sold his Krispy Kreme shops to the company in 1983 and retired from the doughnut business in 1985.

Lewis Rudolph died in Nashville, Tennessee, on December 28, 2014, at the age of 95. He was survived by his wife, Jeanne Fisher Rudolph, whom he married in 1937; four children, twelve grandchildren, twenty-two great-grandchildren and one great, great-grandchild.
