= Off for the Sweet Hereafter =

1986 novel by T. R. Pearson

- Author: T. R. Pearson
- Published: 1986

Off for the Sweet Hereafter is a 1986 novel by T. R. Pearson. The story opens with a sentence over 400 words long. This opening sets the stage for the rambling tone of the entire novel, which consists more of digressions than of straightforward plot.

== Plot summary ==
Raeford Benton Lynch, nephew to the bald Jeeter, is a cipher, remarkable only for being gangly and horse-faced. On a whim, he accepts a job "digging holes" for Mr. Claude Ellwyn Overhill, who drives a motley assortment of riff-raff around the south, disinterring and relocating the denizens of graveyards that had to be moved to make room for development.

Benton Lynch meets Jane Elizabeth Firesheets when he and Mr. Overhill's crew disinter her grandmomma. Jane Elizabeth, for some inscrutable reason, takes a fancy to Benton Lynch, beguiling him with her "milky white parts" and "plum colored parts."

Trouble comes in the form of Jimmy, a petty criminal whose renegade nature lures Jane Elizabeth Firesheets away from Benton Lynch. In order to prove that he is as dangerous and ambitious—and thus as alluring—as Jimmy, Benton Lynch takes to holding up convenience stores and sending clippings about the crimes to Jane Elizabeth Firesheets. This wins her affections away from Jimmy but has an unintended side effect: Jane Elizabeth Firesheets pictures herself as Bonnie to Benton Lynch's Clyde, and insists that the two take off on a crime spree that ends in the shooting of an elderly store clerk.
