= James A. Gray Jr. =

American politician

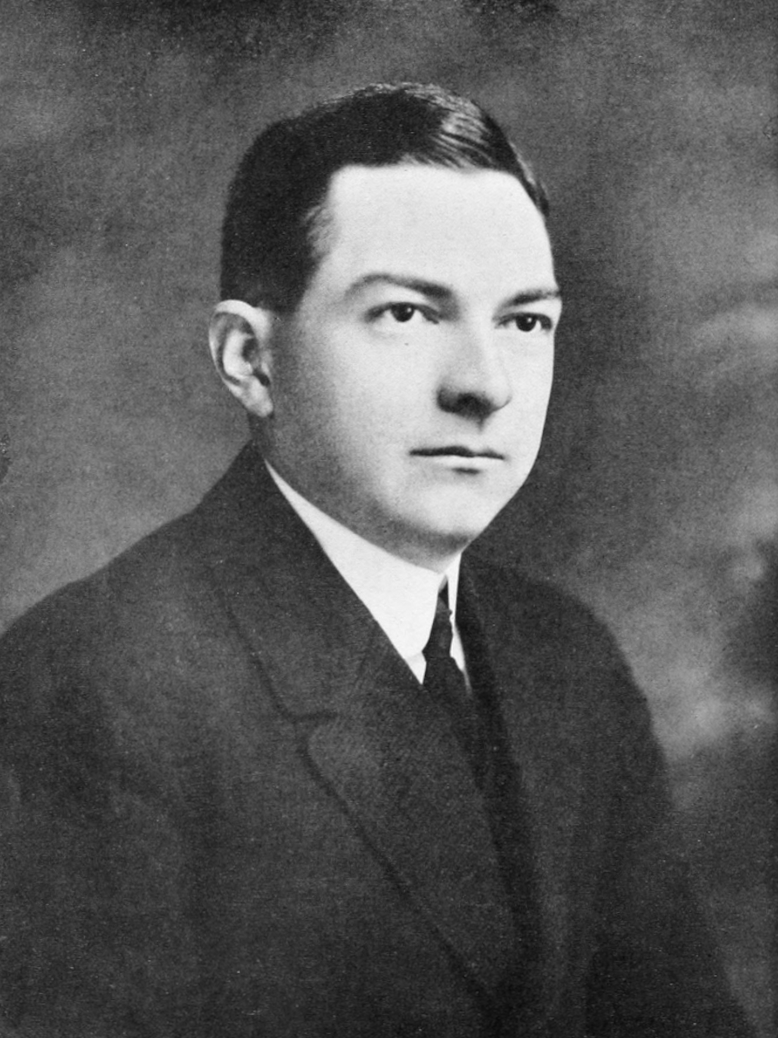

Member of the North Carolina Senate
- In office 1917–1920

Personal details
- Born: James Alexander Gray Jr. August 21, 1889 Winston-Salem, North Carolina, U.S.
- Died: October 29, 1952 (aged 63) Winston-Salem, North Carolina, U.S.
- Resting place: Salem Cemetery
- Party: Democratic
- Spouse: Pauline
- Children: 6
- Education: University of North Carolina at Chapel Hill
- Occupation: President and Chairman of R.J. Reynolds Tobacco Company, 1935-1949
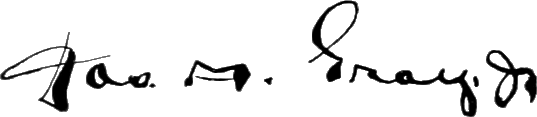
- Signature

James Alexander Gray Jr. (August 21, 1889 – October 29, 1952) was a president and chairman of R. J. Reynolds Tobacco Company in Winston-Salem, North Carolina. He was the brother of fellow R.J. Reynolds president Bowman Gray Sr. He also served as a North Carolina state senator for two terms and as a philanthropist, donated to a variety of educational causes in North Carolina.

== Early life and family ==
Gray was born in Winston-Salem to Wachovia co-founder James Alexander Gray and the former Aurelia Bowman. After receiving his primary and secondary education in his hometown, Gray graduated from the University of North Carolina at Chapel Hill in 1908. He became a clerk at Wachovia, eventually rising within 10 years to a position as vice-president. In 1919, Gray joined the board of directors at Wachovia, on which he remained the rest of his life.

Gray lived in the house he was born in for his entire life. He married Pauline L. Bahnson on April 18, 1918, and they had six children—James Jr., Bahnson, Howard, Christine, Pauline, and Aurelia. He attended Centenary United Methodist Church, and his nephew was Gordon Gray.

In 1912, Gray's brother Bowman moved his family to Winston to take up his new position of vice-president and director of R. J. Reynolds, hand-picked by R. J. Reynolds himself to head the company's finance division. In 1924, Bowman was promoted to president of the company to succeed Reynolds' brother William Neal Reynolds, and in 1932 Bowman became the chairman of the board of directors.

== Political career ==
Gray served two terms in the North Carolina State Senate as a Democrat. He co-introduced North Carolina's first state income tax.

== Chairmanship of R.J. Reynolds ==
Gray followed his brother to R.J. Reynolds from Wachovia in 1920, and he took over the helm of Reynolds Co. himself in 1935. As vice-president, Gray lowered the company's debt and listed it on the New York Stock Exchange. As president, Gray served as chairman longer than anyone except for R.J. Reynolds himself, and he used innovative marketing techniques to propel the company's Camel brand back into popularity as the top-selling cigarette brand. In 1939, Gray installed vacuum conditioners, which allowed the company to end the use of sweathouses. Gray also developed an American source for the company's paper production, which had previously been imported. In July 1950, Gray was featured on the cover of Fortune magazine for his success at Reynolds.

== Philanthropy ==
Gray left behind him a legacy of philanthropy. He was inspired to do so after his brother Bowman's unexpected death at sea from a heart attack in 1935. Gray worked with other family members to fulfill Bowman's wish that Wake Forest University establish a four-year medical school, and in 1941, the Bowman Gray School of Medicine opened on property donated by the family, with funds bequested in Bowman's will. Gray later established the J.A. Gray Endowment for the Winston-Salem Foundation in 1947 with $1.7 million ($24.5 million in 2025 dollars). The fund helped educational institutions such as UNC-Chapel Hill, Salem College, Winston-Salem State University, Duke University, and many other North Carolina colleges. The donation to UNC established a professorial chair for the study of the Bible. Today, the Gray Endowment allows UNC to compete with private universities for faculty salaries. Gray's gift to Duke was given to the Divinity School on one condition for UNC's athletic rival: "I fixed the gift to Duke so that they can't use it for the football team." The school holds the Gray Lecture Series annually every fall.

Winston-Salem State University also hosts an annual James A. Gray Symposium and lecture series in Gray's honor. Gray's largest gift was reserved for the medical school named after his brother. He also created an endowment for Greensboro College, which his mother had attended in the 19th century. A high school in Winston-Salem, James A. Gray High School, was named in his honor.

On October 29, 1952, Gray died of a heart attack at a hospital in Winston-Salem at the age of 63. He was buried at Salem Cemetery. The next day, the Winston-Salem Journal wrote: "The death of James A. Gray casts a pall of sadness over this community and the entire State. Few have done more to advance the economic progress and promote the social welfare of Winston-Salem, Forsyth County and North Carolina as a whole than this quiet, unassuming business, civic and religious leader who for over forty years was an inspiring, dynamic influence in the life of the community and commonwealth."
