= Brian Robinson (basketball) =

American basketball coach (born 1971)

Current position
- Title: Head coach
- Team: Bishop McGuinness
- Conference: Greater Triad 1A/2A Conference
- Record: 600–197

Biographical details
- Born: 1971 (age 54–55); Winston-Salem, North Carolina, U.S.
- Education: R.J. Reynolds HS, Appalachian State University

Coaching career (HC unless noted)
- 1994–1998: R.J Reynolds HS(asst.),
- 1998–2002: Starmount HS
- 2002–present: Bishop McGuinness
- 2010–2011: Southeastern University(asst.)

Head coaching record
- Overall: 600–197 (.741)
- Tournaments: 85–14

Accomplishments and honors

Championships
- 11× NCHSAA 1A State Champions (2006–2014, 2022, 2023)

Awards
- 2007 USA Today National Coach of the Year; 2010 NC Associated Press' State Coach of the Year; 2013 USA Today NC Coach of the Year, Named one of the Top 100 Coaches To Remember honoring the Top 100 coaches in the history of the NCHSAA, male or female in any sport

Records
- North Carolina High School Athletic Association (NCHSAA) Record for Most Consecutive State Championshops in Women's Basketball, Winning 9 Straight

Brian Robinson (born 1971) is a high school basketball coach for Bishop McGuinness Catholic High School in Kernersville, North Carolina. He led the Bishop McGuinness women's basketball team to nine straight NCHSAA 1A state championships, which is a state record for women's basketball. The Villains won their 10th state championship in 2022 and won their 11th state title the following year in 2023. He formerly served on the board to pick the North Carolina Gatorade Player-of-the-Year from 2008-2011 and is the WBCA (Women's Basketball Coaches Association) Chair for the National High School All-American Team.

Robinson is the author of three books and has been a speaker at basketball clinics for the University of Florida, Georgia Tech, and Duke University. Was named one of the Top 100 High School Coaches in the 100-year history of the NCHSAA in 2013, known as a "Coach To Remember" in any sport, for either gender. Robinson was named a Living Legend in 2010 by The Winston-Salem Recreation and Parks Department.

== Early years ==
Robinson attended R.J. Reynolds High School in Winston-Salem, North Carolina. He played for Coach Howard West . Robinson also was a baseball player. After graduating from high school, Robinson attended Appalachian State University, and graduated with a degree in Business Administration in 1994. Robinson was an All-City Basketball Player as a JV member in 1988. Robinson was named team captain of the R.J.R basketball and baseball teams in 1990. Robinson was team MVP and All-Conference in baseball during the 1990 season. Robinson was the first ever student-athlete speaker at the inaugural R.J.R. Sports Banquet in 1990. He was also awarded the scholastic student-athlete of the year at Reynolds in 1990. In 2025, Robinson was selected to the R.J. Reynolds High School Hall of Fame.

== Coaching career ==
Robinson began his high school coaching career at his alma mater, R.J. Reynolds High School. At Reynolds, Robinson coached the 9th Grade Boys' Team for two seasons, and was Varsity Boys' Assistant for two seasons. Robinson's 9th grade teams were 24–13 in his two seasons, while as a varsity assistant, the team won two Central Piedmont Conference 4A Regular Season and Tournament Titles. The team made the State 4A Regionals in 1996–97, and the Sectional Finals in 1997–98. Robinson also coached JV Baseball at Reynolds for three seasons. Before coming to Bishop, Robinson spent the previous four seasons as Head Varsity Boys' Coach at Starmount High School in Yadkin County. Robinson's Teams made the state playoffs twice, and finished as high as third place in the Northwest 1A Conference in 1999–2000.

Robinson coached one season of college basketball at Southeastern University in Lakeland, Florida, as a women's basketball assistant.

Robinson founded The Winston-Salem Stealers Girls AAU / Club Basketball Program in 1996. The program has sent over 190 girls to play ball in college. Robinson is also founder of the Teach The Game and CRC programs for girls basketball in the Triad Area.

Robinson is the director of The Maddawg Center Basketball Facility located in Kernersville, North Carolina. The Maddawg Center is on the campus formerly owned by Dudley Cosmetology Hair Products.

== Bishop McGuinness ==
Robinson was named the head coach at Bishop in 2002. Under the direction of Robinson, the Bishop women's basketball team won 9 straight state titles, which is a state record for women's basketball, between 2006-2014; then won back-to-back state championships in 2022 and 2023. Robinson was named the Northwest 1A Conference Coach of the Year in 2005-06 and 2008–09 then won the award again in 2013-14, 2019–20 and 2023-24. Robinson was also a three-time Runner-Up for the NCHSAA State Coach of the Year in 2005–06, 2006–07, and 2011–12 as voted on by the Associated Press in North Carolina. In 2007-08 and 2012–13, Robinson was the second runner-up for the AP State Coach of the Year. In 2009-10 Robinson was selected as the Associated Press' State Coach of the Year. Robinson has finished in the top four for AP State Coach of the Year eleven times. Robinson was also named Coach of the Year by the Greensboro News & Record in 2005–06, 2007–08 and 2011–12, by The Winston-Salem Journal in 2022, by Triad Sports in 2005-06 and 2009–10, and by NCPreps.com in 2006–07. Robinson and the Bishop girls run of 9 straight titles ended with they lost to Hayesville 64–41 in the second round of the 2015 NCHSAA 1A tournament. Robinson led the Villains to the state playoffs in each of his twenty-four seasons at McGuinness. The Villains have won 11 state titles, made 17 final fours, 20 elite eights, 21 sweet sixteens, 12 conference regular tournaments championships, and 10 regular season titles. The Villains have been ranked twice in USA Today's National Poll, in 2006 and 2007 with a high ranking of #11.

== International coaching ==
In 2013, Robinson was named an assistant coach for the U-16 Women's National Basketball Team which won gold. Robinson was also an assistant coach for the Under-17 USA Women's National Team in 2013 and 2014 where the team won gold medals both year. He won a third gold medal in 2021 in Mexico working as support staff for USA Basketball's U16 women's national team. Robinson worked with USA Basketball from 2007-2023 working on the youth development side, the national team side, selection committees, legal certification gold license committees and as a speaker at clinics around the country. Robinson worked as a team liaison for the Nigerian Women's National Team for the Pre-Oymplic Festival in 2021 in Las Vegas.
