= T. R. Pearson =

American writer (born 1956)

- Born: Thomas Reid Pearson; 1956 (age 69–70); Winston-Salem, North Carolina, U.S.
- Education: North Carolina State University (BA, MA)
- Occupation: Writer
- Writing career
- Pen name: Rick Gavin
- Genre: Crime fiction
- Notable works: A Short History of a Small Place (1985); Off for the Sweet Hereafter (1986)

Thomas Reid Pearson (born 1956) is an American writer. Pearson also writes crime fiction under the pen name Rick Gavin.

== Biography ==
Pearson was born in Winston-Salem, North Carolina. He graduated from Richard J. Reynolds High School. He was a student at North Carolina State University, where he gained a B.A and M.A in English. He went on to teach at Peace College in Raleigh, North Carolina. He started work on a PhD in Pennsylvania but soon returned to North Carolina, where he worked as a carpenter and a house painter while he began writing his first two novels, A Short History of a Small Place and Off for the Sweet Hereafter. Neither was published until 1985, when he moved to New York City, where both books were issued by Linden Press.

His novels are set in the South, in the imaginary small town of Neely, near Winston-Salem, or, in his more recent novels, in the Appalachian areas of Virginia, where he now lives. His writing captures a uniquely Southern social order, outlook, and voice and has been compared to the work of Mark Twain and William Faulkner.

A Short History of a Small Place, Off for the Sweet Hereafter, The Last of How It Was, Cry Me a River, Polar and Blue Ridge were New York Times Notable Books.

Pearson collaborated with John Grisham on early drafts of the screenplays for The Rainmaker (1997) and Runaway Jury (1998), films based on two of Grisham's novels.

Under the pen name Rick Gavin, Pearson wrote a series of three crime novels, set in the Mississippi Delta, featuring repo man Nick Reid and his best friend, Desmond.

Pearson lives in North Carolina.

== Works ==
=== Novels ===
==== Neely trilogy ====
- A Short History of a Small Place (Linden Press, 1985)
- Off for the Sweet Hereafter (Linden Press, 1986)
- The Last of How It Was (Linden Press, 1987)

==== Ray Tatum Mysteries ====
- Cry Me a River (Henry Holt, 1993)
- Blue Ridge (Viking, 2000)
- Polar (Viking, 2002)
- Warwolf (Barking Mad Press, 2011)
- First in Flight (Barking Mad Press, 2015)
- Brigade (Barking Mad Press, 2018)

==== Nick Reid and Desmond series (as Rick Gavin) ====
- Ranchero (Minotaur Books, 2011)
- Beluga (Minotaur Books, 2012)
- Nowhere Nice (Minotaur Books, 2013)

==== Standalone novels ====
- Call and Response (Linden Press, 1989)
- Gospel Hour (William Morrow, 1991)
- True Cross (Viking, 2003)
- Glad News of the Natural World (Simon & Schuster, 2005)
- Red Scare: A Novel of Venomous Intrigue (Barking Mad Press, 2008)
- Jerusalem Gap (Barking Mad Press, 2010)
- East Jesus South (Barking Mad Press, 2014)
- Low Lords (Barking Mad Press, 2016)
- Theory of the Case (Barking Mad Press, 2017)
- Eaglesworth (Barking Mad Press, 2018)
- Serpent of Old (Barking Mad Press, 2019)
- Sleepaway (Barking Mad Press, 2019)
- Confederate States (Barking Mad Press, 2020)
- Devil Up (Barking Mad Press, 2021)
- Joy to the Just (Barking Mad Press, 2022)
- Bone Eye (Barking Mad Press, 2023)

=== Non-fiction ===
- Seaworthy: Adrift with William Willis in the Golden Age of Rafting (Crown, 2006) — Biography of adventurer William Willis.
- Augie's Quest: One Man's Journey from Success to Significance (Bloomsbury USA, 2007) with Augie Nieto
- Year of Our Lord: Faith, Hope and Harmony in the Mississippi Delta (Mockingbird Publishing, 2010) — Text by Pearson, photographs by Langdon Clay
- Top of the Rock (Random House, 2012) with Warren Littlefield

=== As editor ===
- I'll Sleep When I'm Dead: The Dirty Life and Times of Warren Zevon, by Crystal Zevon (HarperCollins, 2009)
