= Bonnie Angelo =

American journalist

- Born: Veronica Estelle Angelo; January 29, 1924; Winston-Salem, North Carolina, U.S.
- Died: September 17, 2017 (aged 93); Bethesda, Maryland, U.S.
- Education: Woman's College of the University of North Carolina
- Occupations: Journalist, writer
- Years active: 1950s–2008
- Employer: Time
- Notable work: First Mothers
- Spouse: Harold Levy (?–1998; his death)

Veronica Estelle "Bonnie" Angelo (January 29, 1924 – September 17, 2017) was an American journalist and author. She was known for being the author of First Mothers. During her more than a quarter-century with Time, she served as a Washington correspondent from 1967–78, reported on the White House and covered newsmakers and events across America and the world.

== Early life ==
Angelo was born in Winston-Salem, North Carolina in 1924. She was educated at Richard J. Reynolds High School and the Woman's College of the University of North Carolina. Her husband, Harold Levy, died in 1998. They had one child, a son, Christopher Levy.

== Career ==
Angelo was a weekly co-host on the Washington television program Panorama. She covered reports revolving around the Ford presidency in the 1970s. In 1978, she was appointed Time's bureau chief in London. In the United Kingdom, she covered Margaret Thatcher's election as Prime Minister, the 1981 royal wedding of Prince Charles and Lady Diana Spencer, and the sectarian violence in Northern Ireland.

In 2000, she wrote the book First Mothers: The Women Who Shaped the Presidents, a corrective to a widely held notion that First Ladies were the dominant female influence on the nation's commanders in chief.

== Death ==
Angelo died at a nursing home in Bethesda, Maryland from complications from dementia on September 17, 2017, at the age of 93.
