= James Norwood Pratt =

American Author, Educator and Speaker

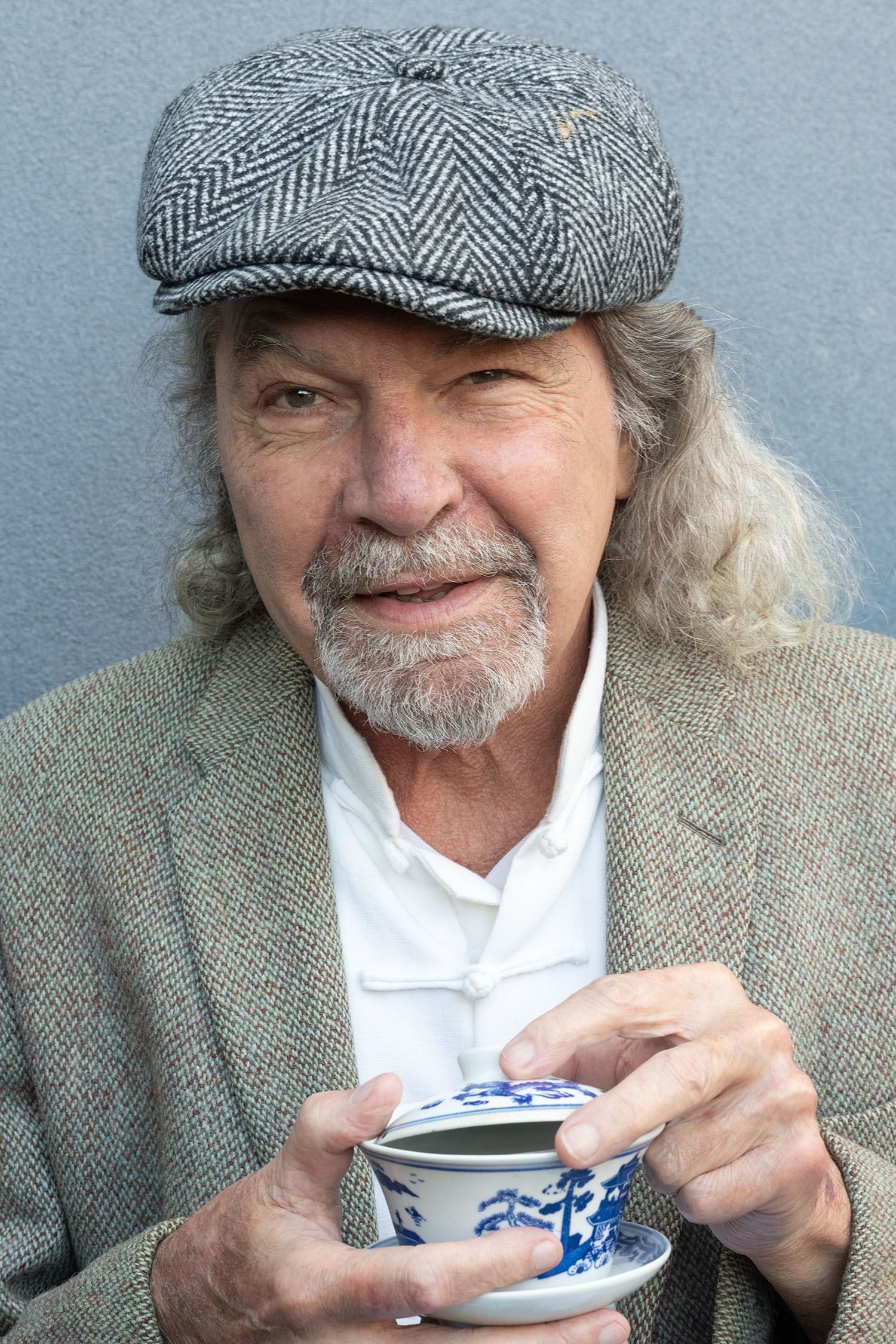
- Born: Winston-Salem, North Carolina
- Education: University of North Carolina at Chapel Hill
- Occupation: Author
- Spouse: Valerie Turner Pratt
- Awards: Lifetime Achievement Award, World Tea Expo (2015) Best New Publication, World Tea Expo (2010)
- Website: www.jamesnorwoodpratt.com

James Norwood Pratt (born March 27, 1942) is an American author, educator, and speaker, on the topics of wine, tea, and tea lore. Known as "America's Tea Sage," he is possibly the world's most widely read authority on tea and tea lore.

== Early years ==
He was born in Winston-Salem, North Carolina, and brought up in Forsyth County, North Carolina.

His mother, Helen Davis Pratt, was a graduate of the oldest female educational establishment that is still a women's college, Salem College in Winston-Salem, North Carolina. She majored in Latin and English literature, subjects she subsequently taught high school students. His father, Eugene C. Pratt, was an actor and musician, turned tobacco company executive and political activist, turned self-employed businessman and farmer.

James Norwood Pratt was educated at R.J. Reynolds High School, the University of North Carolina at Chapel Hill, and in Europe. While at the University of North Carolina at Chapel Hill, he enrolled in its Honors Program, infamously named the "Suicide 50" given the extreme obstacles enrollees faced in the program. In 1960, as part of the Honors Program, Pratt made his first journey to Europe aboard RMS Queen Mary. On his return journey, on its sister ship RMS Queen Elizabeth, Pratt first met his future wife, Valerie Turner Pratt.

Since 1965, he has lived chiefly in San Francisco, California.

== Literary works ==
In California, he wrote his first book The Wine Bibber's Bible (1971), which sold a half-million copies. The acknowledged classic became an indispensable guide to the finest wines of California, and received stellar reviews. Among others, the San Francisco Chronicle noted that it is "[a] delightful book . . . built upon extensive knowledge," and the Washington Post noted that it is "[i]lluminated by love and garnished with literary allusion."

He is best known for his books on tea, including James Norwood Pratt's Tea Lover's Treasury (1982), The Tea Lover's Companion (1995), and Reading Tea Leaves (1996) as authored "by a Highland Seer."

James Norwood Pratt's Tea Lover's Treasury includes an introduction by preeminent American food writer, M.F.K. Fisher, who notes that: "Norwood Pratt's book about tea is written so deftly, in its heady combination of learning and pure love, that its pages will cheer us long after what's in the cup is cold and stale."

In 2000, he brought out James Norwood Pratt's NEW Tea Lover's Treasury, a complete re-casting of his earlier work in the light of increased information. This book is often used as a training manual in the United States tea trade, and has been translated into German with the title Tee für Geniesser.

Beginning in 2007, James Norwood Pratt began contributing articles to the tea blog, T Ching. He published more than 25 articles on artisan teas and tea history until 2014.

In 2010, he authored James Norwood Pratt's Tea Dictionary, which was named Best New Publication by the World Tea Expo (2010). The comprehensive dictionary was designed as a handbook for the international tea trade, but intended to be accessible and useful to tea lovers of every description. The book includes terms for cultivation, manufacture, tasting, trading, marketing, and classification of tea.

Most recently, in 2017, he annotated and released The Romance of Tea, William Ukers' 1936 work describing the legendary and true origins of tea, the spread of its consumption as a beverage, and the romantic trade that grew up around it, among other topics. The New York Times described The Romance of Tea as "[a] truly delightful history of the tea plant's 1600 years of beneficent ministry to man's comfort and aesthetic pleasure."

In March 2024, Pratt published "The Tea Lover's Treasury - 40th Anniversary Edition" and for the first time released an audiobook version of his classic book on tea.

== Tea trade milestones ==
He was named Honorary Director of the Imperial Tea Court, a traditional Chinese teahouse founded in 1993 by Roy Fong in San Francisco, now located in the San Francisco Ferry Building. Mr. Pratt has played a major role in disseminating China tea information and tea ways in America and the West. He first anglicized the name for the Chinese covered cup, for example, as "gaiwan" and on second thought changed the spelling to "guywan." Both spellings are now found in English, French and German.

Also a speaker and teacher, Mr. Pratt has addressed audiences from Zurich, Switzerland (Le Club des Buveurs de The Suisse) and London's Kew Gardens to Hangzhou (China Tea Research Institute). He served as International Juror at India's first-ever tea competition, The Golden Leaf India Awards 2005, in Coonoor, India. He has served as a consultant, teacher, taster or spokesman for several tea companies.

Profiling him as "The Renaissance man of the tea industry" in Fresh Cup magazine's "1999 Tea Almanac", Michelle Williams wrote: "Parts historian, connoisseur, and world-traveller...he has carved out a reputation as the consummate spokesman for US tea consumers. His wit and dedication to the beverage have helped spread the gospel of tea to tens of thousands of people."

In 2007 he helped stage a Festival of Tea for Santa Fe Opera's premier production of "Tea: A Mirror of Soul" by Chinese composer Tan Dun. Extensive interviews with Mr. Pratt are featured in the 2009 book, The Meaning of Tea: A Tea Inspired Journey. He appears in Scott Chamberlin Hoyt's 2008 documentary film of the same name.

== Quotes ==
"America's new tea lovers are the people who have forced the tea trade to wake up. Elsewhere, tea has meant a certain way, a certain tradition, for centuries, but this is America! The American tea lover is heir to all the world's tea drinking traditions, from Japanese tea ceremonies to Russian samovars to English scones in the afternoon. India chai, China green, you name it and we can claim it and make it ours. And that's just what we are doing. In this respect, ours is the most innovative and exciting tea scene anywhere." ~James Norwood Pratt in "A Life in Tea: James Norwood Pratt's (not so) Mad Mission" by Julie Beals, editor-in-chief,

"Taking tea is a moment of windless calm, amid the bluster of daily events has always been one of humanity's favorite pleasures. But beyond pleasure, tea can always provide glimpses of the ultimate reality, usually when we least expect any."

== Sources ==
- Pratt, James Norwood; James Norwood Pratt; Jacques De Caso (1971). The wine bibber's bible. 101 Productions. ISBN 0-89286-182-7.
- Pratt, James Norwood (1982). The Tea Lover's Treasury. 101 Productions. ISBN 0-89286-191-6.
- Pratt, James Norwood (1999). The NEW Tea Lover's Treasury. 101 Productions. ISBN 0-9741486-0-1.
- Williams, Michelle (December 1998). "Profile - James Norwood Pratt". 1999 Tea Almanac. 7: 60.
- Hoyt, Scott Chamberlin; Phil Cousineau (September 2009). The Meaning of Tea: A Tea Inspired Journey. Talking Leaves Press. p. 362. ISBN 978-0-615-20442-0.
