= Burton C. Gray =

Economist, businessman, and political theorist (1941–1989)

- Born: Burton Craige Gray; April 1, 1941; Winston-Salem, NC, U.S.
- Died: October 27, 1989 (aged 48); Atlanta, Georgia, U.S.
- Spouses: Ann Clark (m. 1968, divorced); Deecy Stephens (m. 1988)

Academic background
- Education: Yale University (BA); University of Chicago
- Influences: Friedrich Hayek; Michael Oakeshott

Academic work
- Discipline: Economics; Political philosophy
- School or tradition: Austrian School; Chicago School

Burton Craige Gray (April 1, 1941 – October 27, 1989) was an American economist, entrepreneur, and conservative political theorist. He co-founded Scientific Time Sharing Corporation with Dan Dyer and Lawrence M. Breed, a computer software firm in the Washington, D.C. area specializing in the programming language APL.

== Biography ==
Gray was born in Winston-Salem, North Carolina, and died in Atlanta, Georgia. He was the son of Gordon Gray and brother of C. Boyden Gray.

In 1968, he married Ann Clark. The marriage ended in divorce. He married Dorothy "Deecy" Stephens on November 5, 1988. He was a board member of the Reason Foundation and the Philadelphia Society. He was a co-founder of the Federalist Society and active in the Libertarian Party. The Reason Foundation established the Burton C. Gray Memorial Internship in his honor.
