= Clement M. Eyler =

American football and basketball coach and educator

Biographical details
- Born: May 21, 1897; Winston-Salem, North Carolina, U.S.
- Died: February 15, 1979 (aged 81); Cookeville, Tennessee, U.S.

Coaching career (HC unless noted)

Football
- 1932: Milligan

Basketball
- 1926–1942: Milligan

Head coaching record
- Overall: 0–6 (football)

Clement Manley Eyler (May 21, 1897 – February 15, 1979) was an American football and basketball coach and educator. He served as the head basketball coach at Milligan College—now known as Milligan University—in Milligan College, Tennessee from 1926 to 1942. Eyler was also the head football coach at Milligan for one season, in 1932.

Eyler studied at the University of Georgia, Columbia University, and the University of Tennessee. In addition to coaching, he was also an English professor at Milligan. Eyler was the superintendent of schools in Bristol, Tennessee for 10 years before joining the English Department at Tennessee Polytechnic Institute—now known as Tennessee Technological University—in Cookeville, Tennessee in 1957.

Eyler died on February 15, 1979, in Cookeville, after a long illness.

== Head coaching record ==
=== Football ===
Year	Team	Overall	Conference	Standing	Bowl/playoffs
Milligan Buffaloes (Smoky Mountain Conference) (1932–1941)
1932	Milligan	0–6	0–4	6th	
Milligan:		0–6	0–4		
Total:		0–6			
