= Gordon Gray (politician) =

American politician (1909–1982)

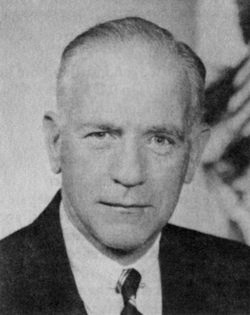
- Official portrait, c. 1958

4th United States National Security Advisor
- In office June 24, 1958 – January 13, 1961
- President: Dwight Eisenhower
- Preceded by: Robert Cutler
- Succeeded by: McGeorge Bundy

Director of the Office of Defense Mobilization
- In office March 14, 1957 – June 24, 1958
- President: Dwight Eisenhower
- Preceded by: Arthur Flemming
- Succeeded by: Leo Hoegh (Office of Civil and Defense Mobilization)

Assistant Secretary of Defense for International Security Affairs
- In office July 14, 1955 – February 27, 1957
- President: Dwight Eisenhower
- Preceded by: Struve Hensel
- Succeeded by: Mansfield Sprague

President of the University of North Carolina System
- In office October 12, 1950 – June 10, 1955
- Preceded by: Frank Graham
- Succeeded by: Bill Friday

2nd United States Secretary of the Army
- In office April 28, 1949 – April 12, 1950
- President: Harry Truman
- Preceded by: William Henry Draper Jr.
- Succeeded by: Frank Pace

Personal details
- Born: May 30, 1909 Baltimore, Maryland, U.S.
- Died: November 26, 1982 (aged 73) Washington, D.C., U.S.
- Party: Democratic
- Spouse(s): Jane Boyden Craige; Nancy Maguire Beebe
- Children: 4, including Burton and Boyden
- Education: University of North Carolina, Chapel Hill (BA); Yale University (LLB)

Military service
- Allegiance: United States
- Branch/service: United States Army
- Years of service: 1942–1945
- Rank: Captain

Gordon Gray (May 30, 1909 – November 26, 1982) was an American attorney and government official during the administrations of Harry Truman (1945–53) and Dwight Eisenhower (1953–61) associated with defense and national security.

== Early life ==
Gordon Gray was born in Baltimore, Maryland, the son of Bowman Gray Sr. and Nathalie Lyons Gray. His father Bowman, his uncle James A. Gray Jr. and later his brother, Bowman Gray Jr., were all heads of R.J. Reynolds Tobacco Company. In 1942, he was described as "one of the nation's wealthiest young men".

Gordon Gray attended Woodberry Forest School for high school. He graduated from the University of North Carolina in 1930, where he was a member of Delta Kappa Epsilon fraternity (Beta chapter) and the Order of Gimghoul. He earned his law degree from Yale Law School in 1933. UNC presented Gray with an honorary law degree in 1949.

== Career ==
Gray practiced law for two years in New York City before returning to Winston-Salem. In 1937, he bought the Piedmont Publishing Company, owner of the Winston-Salem Journal, The Twin City Sentinel, and WSJS radio. He added W41MM (the state's first FM station) in 1941, WSJS-FM in 1947 and WSJS-TV in 1953.

In 1941, he was one of the directors of the short-lived American Network FM radio network. He sold the newspapers in 1968, but formed Triangle Broadcasting to hold onto WSJS-AM-FM-TV. He also bought the local cable franchise for Winston-Salem, a move that forced him to sell off the broadcasting outlets in 1972.

He served in the North Carolina General Assembly from 1939 to 1943 and from 1947 to 1949, representing Forsyth County. He entered the U.S. Army in 1942 as a private and rose to captain, serving in Europe with General Omar Bradley's forces. Gray's service to the federal government began with his appointment as President Harry S. Truman's assistant secretary of the army in 1947; two years later, he was appointed Secretary of the Army. Gordon Gray ordered West Point to add a portrait of Lee wearing Confederate gray at the "height of his fame." He served in this post from 1949 until 1950. The following year he became director of the newly formed Psychological Strategy Board which planned for and coordinated government psychological operations; he remained in the post until his resignation in January 1952, all the while continuing to lead the University of North Carolina. He was the second president of the Consolidated University of North Carolina, succeeding Frank Porter Graham in 1950.

In 1954, Gray chaired a committee appointed by AEC chairman Lewis Strauss, which recommended revoking Robert Oppenheimer's security clearance. The Gray Board, as it was known, issued its split decision on May 27, 1954, with Gray and Thomas A. Morgan recommending the revocation, despite their finding that Oppenheimer was a "loyal citizen." Ward V. Evans, a conservative Republican and the third member of the board, dissented, saying that most of the allegations against Oppenheimer had been heard before, in 1947, when he had originally received his clearance. In American Prometheus: The Triumph and Tragedy of J. Robert Oppenheimer, Martin Sherwin and Kai Bird severely criticize Gray's handling of the hearings. Gray allowed AEC lawyers to brief the board for a full week without Oppenheimer's counsel being present. Moreover, Gray let the prosecutors use documents and testimonies to which Oppenheimer's attorneys were denied access, as well as material that had been obtained by illegal means, including unwarranted wiretaps. Sherwin and Bird called the Gray Board a "veritable kangaroo court in which the head judge accepted the prosecutor's lead". In 2022, Department of Energy Secretary Jennifer Granholm set aside the revocation findings.

Gray shocked proponents of public education in North Carolina when he said, in a November 1954 Founder's Day speech at Guilford College, that "if I had to make a choice between a complete system of publicly supported higher education or a complete system of private higher education, I would choose the latter as a greater safeguard of the things for which we live." Less than a year later, Secretary of Defense Charles Erwin Wilson named Gray assistant secretary for international security affairs and Gray's brief career in academia was ended.

President Dwight D. Eisenhower appointed Gray to head the Office of Defense Mobilization in 1957, where he served until the office's consolidation in 1958. Eisenhower then appointed Gray his National Security Advisor from 1958 until 1961. On January 18, 1961, President Eisenhower awarded Gray the Medal of Freedom. He served on the President's Foreign Intelligence Advisory Board under Presidents John F. Kennedy, Lyndon B. Johnson, Richard M. Nixon and Gerald R. Ford. In 1976, he was awarded the United States Military Academy's Sylvanus Thayer Award.

From 1962 to 1963, Gray was head of the Federal City Council, a group of business, civic, education, and other leaders interested in economic development in Washington, D.C.

Gray was also publisher of the Winston-Salem Journal, chairman of the board of Piedmont Publishing Company, and chairman of the National Trust for Historic Preservation.

== Personal life ==
He was married in 1938 to the former Jane Boyden Craige, and they had four sons: Gordon Gray Jr., Burton C. Gray, C. Boyden Gray and Bernard Gray. After Jane's death, Gray married the former Nancy Maguire Beebe. His son, C. Boyden Gray served as White House counsel for President George Herbert Walker Bush.

Gray died on November 26, 1982, of cancer in his home in Washington, D.C. He was buried at Salem Cemetery in Winston-Salem, North Carolina.

== In popular culture ==
Tony Goldwyn portrays Gray in the 2023 epic biopic film Oppenheimer.

Political offices
New office	Assistant Secretary of the Army; 1947–1948	Succeeded by Tracy Voorhees
Preceded by William Draper	United States Under Secretary of the Army; 1949	Succeeded by Tracy Voorhees
Preceded by Kenneth Royall	United States Secretary of the Army; 1949–1950	Succeeded by Frank Pace
Preceded by Struve Hensel	Assistant Secretary of Defense for International Security Affairs; 1955–1957	Succeeded by Mansfield Sprague
Preceded by Arthur Flemming	Director of the Office of Defense Mobilization; 1957–1958	Succeeded by Leo Hoegh as Director of the Office of Civil and Defense Mobilization
Preceded by Robert Cutler	National Security Advisor; 1958–1961	Succeeded by Mac Bundy
Academic offices
Preceded by Frank Graham	President of the University of North Carolina System; 1950–1955	Succeeded by Bill Friday
