= Richard J. Reynolds High School =

Historic school building in North Carolina, United States

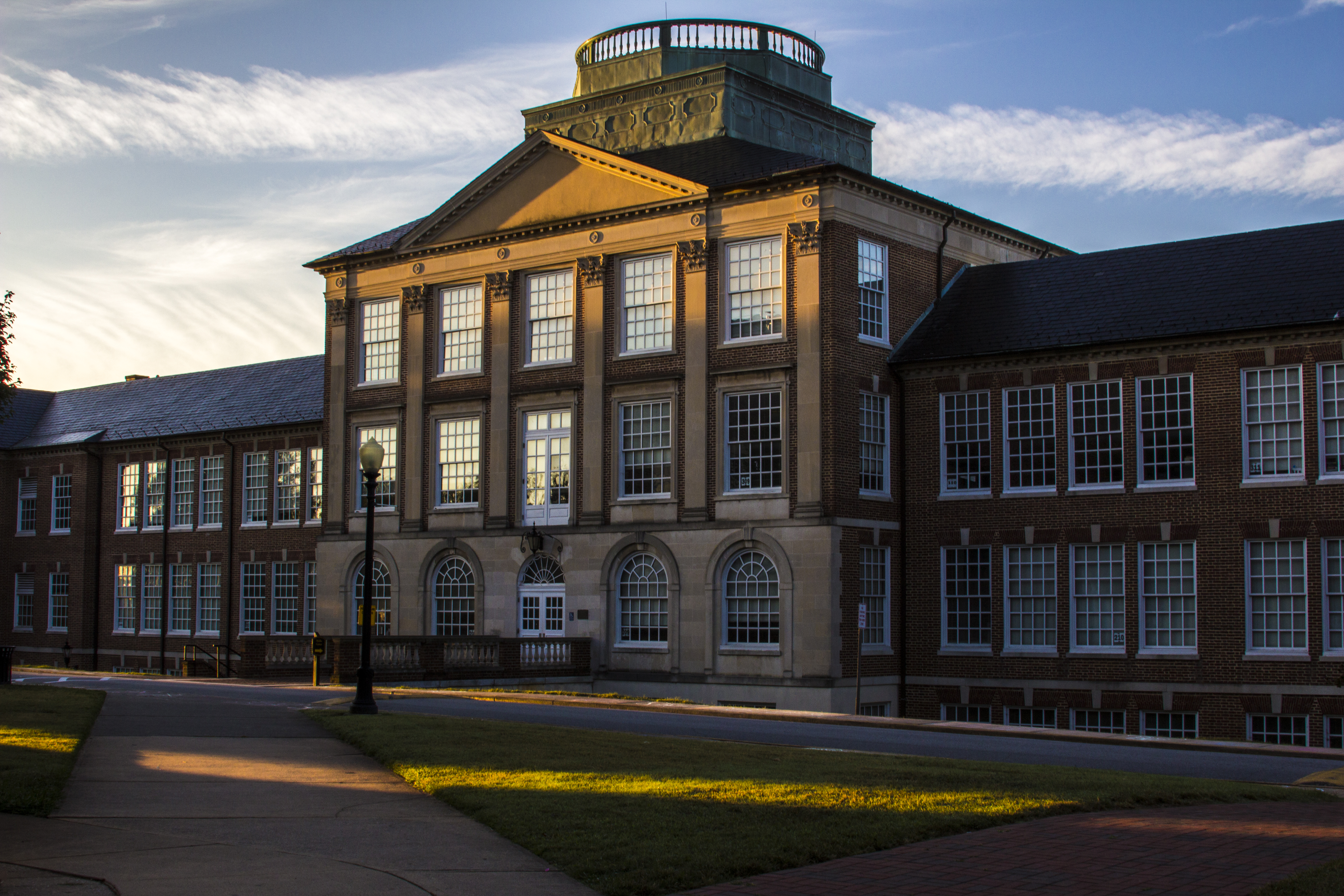
- Richard J. Reynolds High School, September 2014

Location
- 301 N. Hawthorne Road; Winston-Salem, North Carolina 27104; United States

Information
- Type: Public
- Established: 1923 (103 years ago)
- Oversight: Winston-Salem/Forsyth County Schools
- Superintendent: Don Phipps
- CEEB code: 344445
- Principal: Paul Pressley
- Teaching staff: 97.69 (FTE)
- Grades: 9–12
- Enrollment: 1,747 (2023-2024)
- Student to teacher ratio: 17.88
- Campus type: Urban
- Colors: Old Gold and Black
- Athletics: NCHSAA 7A
- Athletics conference: Central Piedmont 7A/8A
- Richard J. Reynolds High School and Richard J. Reynolds Memorial Auditorium
- U.S. National Register of Historic Places
- Location within North Carolina Location within the United States
- Location: 301 Hawthorne Rd., Winston-Salem, North Carolina
- Coordinates: 36°06′05″N 80°15′48″W
- Area: 27.4 acres (11.1 ha)
- Built: 1922–1924
- Architect: Charles Barton Keen
- Architectural style: Colonial Revival, Classical Revival, Early 20th-century industrial
- NRHP reference No.: 90002139
- Added to NRHP: January 11, 1991
- Mascot: Demons
- Rival: Parkland
- Website: wsfcs.k12.nc.us/reynolds

Richard J. Reynolds High School, now the Richard J. Reynolds Magnet School for the Visual and Performing Arts (often simply R. J. Reynolds High School or Reynolds), is a public high school in the Winston-Salem/Forsyth County Schools located in Winston-Salem, North Carolina. Named for R. J. Reynolds, the founder of the R. J. Reynolds Tobacco Company, the school opened in 1923. The school colors are Old Gold and Black, and the school's mascot is a demon.

== Establishment ==
Katharine Smith Reynolds-Johnston (1880–1924), the widow of R. J. Reynolds (1850–1918), donated funds and land for the creation of the school in memory of her first husband. The site was known as Silver Hill. Just weeks before Reynolds-Johnston's death, a souvenir program for the dedication of the Memorial Auditorium says: "In 1919, the City of Winston-Salem, in the course of its ex-tended school building program, planned a model high school, and wished to honor the memory of Richard J. Reynolds, by naming it 'The Richard J. Reynolds High School.'

It seemed to his wife, now Mrs. J. Edward Johnston, that a memorial of this kind was very fitting, as Mr. Reynolds had had such a large part and was so interested in the development of this city. Mrs. Johnston had wanted to erect some really worth while memorial personally, and when notified of the action of the city authorities, it seemed that this plant, which would be so closely identified with the life of the people, young and old, presented the opportunity for which she was looking. She therefore notified the city that she would be glad to give a suitable site upon which to erect the high school, the selection to be left to the City, and to present as a personal memorial, a beautiful auditorium in connection with the high school plant."

== Campus ==
The School and Auditorium sit on a piece of land known as "Society Hill". The complex consists of five buildings, three of which are contributing buildings on the National Register of Historic Places. They are the High School Building (1922–1923), the Power House (1923), and the Auditorium (1923–1924). They were designed in the late 1910s by architect Charles Barton Keen of Philadelphia and built as part of a single project.

Original plans for the School included two grand school buildings sitting on either side of an Auditorium. Construction on the School began in 1919, under the direction of Reynolda House architect Charles Barton Keen. The first classroom building was finished in 1923, but construction on the second building was delayed and eventually abandoned after the Stock Market Crash of 1929. In the early 1990s, the high school building was thoroughly renovated and restored to its original appearance with some modern updating (e.g., a computer lab to replace the former language lab, and central air-conditioning).

The R. J. Reynolds Memorial Auditorium is on the campus and is often used for school functions. The auditorium was constructed in 1924, and a formal opening was held the same year, with Harry Houdini performing. An extensive renovation was completed in 2003. A customized acoustical shell was added to Reynolds Auditorium in 2009.

A fine arts/performing arts building, named the Judy Voss Jones Arts Center for a member of the class of 1968, is on the campus between the R. J. Reynolds Memorial Auditorium and Hawthorne Road. Reynolds became a magnet school for the arts in fall of 2007.

The Richard J. Reynolds High School and Richard J. Reynolds Memorial Auditorium was listed on the National Register of Historic Places in 1991.

To mark the school's 100th anniversary, artist Nick Bragg created an 32-inch by 8-foot mural Silver Hill to Diversity on the second floor whose 40 images illustrate events in the school's history as well as major events in world history. It is the 24th mural created by Bragg, whose work is featured in other areas of the campus.

== Athletics ==
=== State Championships ===
R. J. Reynolds has won the following North Carolina High School Athletic Association (NCHSAA) team state championships:

- Men's Basketball: 1949 (AA), 1975 (4A), 2000 (4A), 2001 (4A), 2002 (4A)
- Men's Cross Country: 1974 (All Classes), 1975 (All Classes), 1976 (All Classes), 1977 (All Classes), 1978 (All Classes)
- Football: 1952 (AAA), 1953 (AAA), 1958 (AAA), 1964 (4A)
- Men's Golf: 1945 (All Classes), 1946 (All Classes), 1968 (All Classes)
- Men's Swimming & Diving: 1984 (All Classes)
- Men's Tennis: 1976 (All Classes), 2010 (4A), 2011 (4A), 2012 (4A)
- Women's Tennis: 1997 (4A)
- Men's Indoor Track & Field: 2006 (All Classes)
- Men's Outdoor Track & Field: 1953 (All Classes), 1955 (All Classes), 1962 (All Classes), 2005 (4A)
- Women's Outdoor Track & Field: 2001 (4A)

== Notable alumni ==
- Bonnie Angelo — journalist and author
- Robert J. Bach — former President of Entertainment & Devices Division at Microsoft
- Richard Burr — United States Senator
- Howell Binkley — professional light designer in New York City
- Debra Conrad — member of the North Carolina House of Representatives from the 74th district
- Carter Covington — television writer and producer
- Kenny Duckett — former NFL wide receiver
- Rick Duckett — college basketball coach
- Mitch Easter — musician, songwriter, and record producer
- Jim Ferree — professional golfer who played on the PGA Tour and Senior PGA Tour
- Ben Folds — musician
- Lois Patricia (Peaches) Hauser Golding — Lord-Lieutenant of Bristol, England, 2017–present
- Tommy Gregg — former MLB player and current coach
- Kimani Griffin — American speed skater who competed at the 2018 Winter Olympics
- Julianna Guill — actress
- George Hamilton IV — American country musician
- Mark Harris — pastor and politician
- Whit Holcomb-Faye — professional basketball player
- Peter Holsapple — musician who formed The dB's, a jangle-pop band
- Frank L. Horton — founder of the Museum of Early Southern Decorative Arts
- Greg Humphreys — singer, guitarist, and songwriter
- Othello Hunter — former NBA player, professional basketball player for Maccabi Tel Aviv of the Israeli Premier League and EuroLeague
- Burgess Jenkins — actor
- Lindsay Jones — composer and sound designer for theatre and film
- Earline Heath King — sculptor who specialized in portraits and statues
- Jack Keenan — NFL offensive guard
- Anthony Levine — NFL safety
- Ed Lyons — former MLB second baseman
- Melissa McBride — actress best known for her role as Carol Peletier on the AMC series The Walking Dead
- Norman M. Miller — highly decorated USN Aviator during World War II
- Phil Morrison — film director
- Ryan Odom — men's college basketball head coach
- T. R. Pearson — writer
- Riley Redgate — author of young adult fiction
- Shavon Revel — football player
- Brian Robinson — basketball coach
- Stuart Scott — former ESPN anchor, sportscaster and media personality
- Chris Stamey — musician, singer, songwriter, and record producer
- Anna Harris Stein — First Lady of North Carolina
- Reyshawn Terry — professional basketball player and 2005 NCAA Champion with North Carolina
- Michael Wilson — stage and screen director
- Earl P. Yates — former rear admiral in the United States Navy
