= Bowman Gray Sr. =

American tobacco businessman (1874–1935)

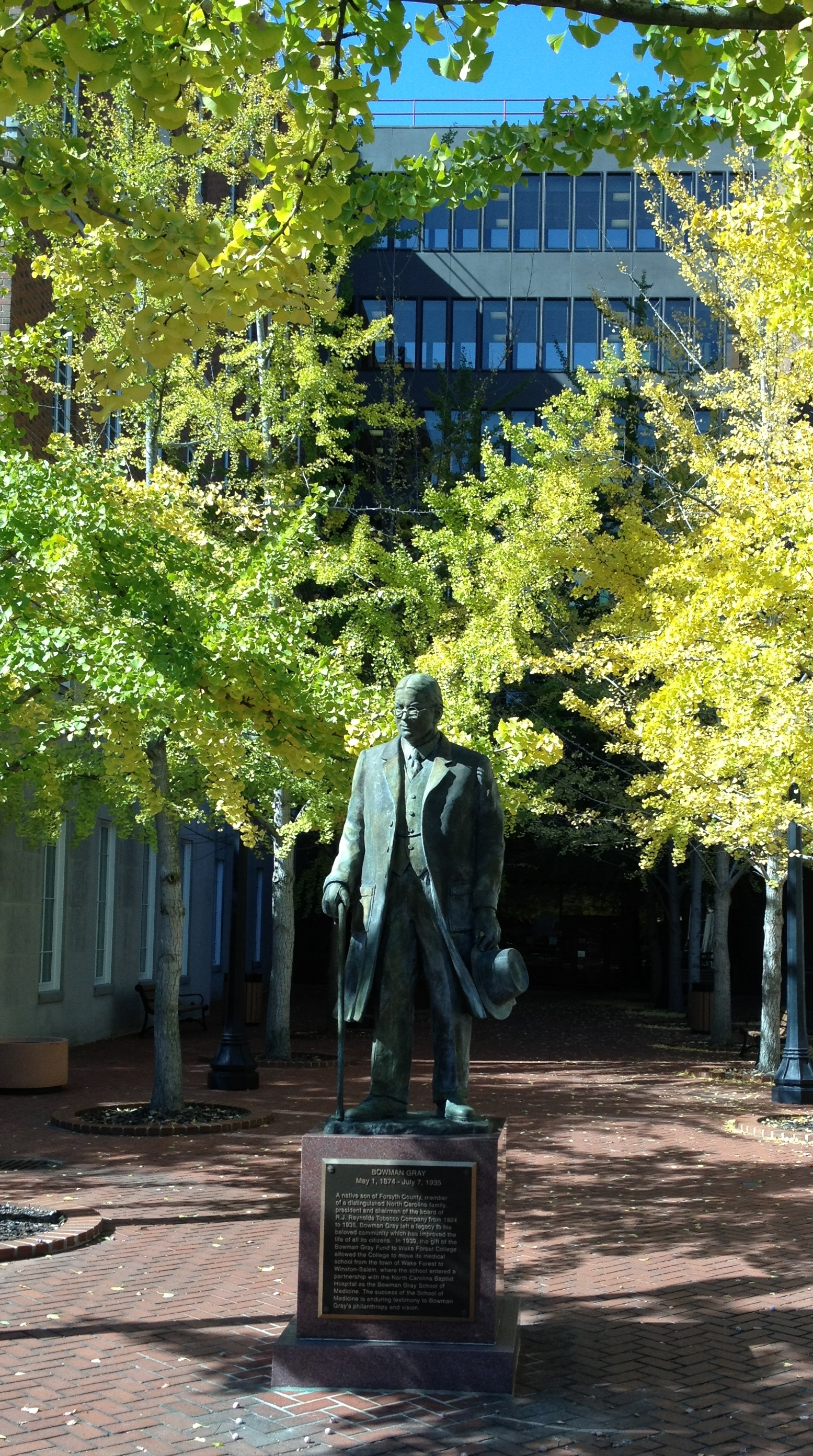
Statue of Gray on the campus of Wake Forest University

Bowman Gray Sr. (May 1, 1874 – July 7, 1935) was president and chairman of R. J. Reynolds Tobacco Company in Winston-Salem, North Carolina, and a major benefactor of the medical school of Wake Forest College which now bears his name.

== Life and career ==
Bowman Gray was born in what was then Winston, North Carolina, to Wachovia Bank co-founder James Alexander Gray and the former Aurelia Bowman. After receiving his primary and secondary education in his hometown, Gray matriculated at the University of North Carolina at Chapel Hill in the 1890-91 academic year and was a member of Sigma Alpha Epsilon fraternity. He left school the following year to become a clerk at Wachovia. In 1895, he began working at R. J. Reynolds as a salesman. His sales success propelled him into management after two years, at which point he moved to Baltimore, Maryland, where he married the former Nathalie Fontaine Lyons on October 1, 1902. There she gave birth to their two sons, Bowman Gray Jr. in 1907 and Gordon Gray in 1909.

In 1912, Gray moved his family to Winston to take up his new position of vice president and director of R. J. Reynolds, picked by Reynolds himself to head the company's finance division. In 1924, he was promoted to president of the company to succeed William Neal Reynolds, and in 1932 he became the chairman of the board of directors. Gray's brother James Gray Jr. would also become president of R. J. Reynolds.

Between 1927 and 1932, he and his wife oversaw the construction of Graylyn, their 87-acre (350,000 m^{2}) estate in the countryside surrounding Winston, across from R.J. Reynolds' estate, Reynolda House. In 1932 when they moved into Graylyn, Gray and his wife donated the land their former house stood upon for the construction of Centenary Methodist Church. Three years after moving to Graylyn, Gray died of a heart attack at age 61 while vacationing with his family aboard a ship off the coast of Norway. He was buried at sea.

Gray donated to philanthropic causes in the region, many times doing so quietly. At the time of his death in 1935, he left $750,000 in stock in R.J. Reynolds Tobacco Company to be used for a cause beneficial to the community. His brother, wife, and two sons eventually decided to donate it to a medical school willing to relocate to Winston-Salem. Wake Forest College, then located in Wake Forest, North Carolina, agreed to move its two-year medical school and expand it to a four-year curriculum, partnering with North Carolina Baptist Hospital. Bowman Gray School of Medicine opened in 1941.

The move of the medical school later inspired members of the Reynolds family to lead efforts to bring the rest of Wake Forest College to Winston-Salem, which occurred in 1956. Today, Wake Forest University, Wake Forest School of Medicine and Wake Forest Baptist Medical Center are key drivers of the region's economy and have national reputations.

Years after Gray's death, Graylyn was donated to the Bowman Gray School of Medicine, where it served as an academic psychiatric hospital facility until 1959. In the 1970s, parts of Graylyn were used as off-campus student housing. In 1979, the main house hosted the Wake Forest University German House. There is a tunnel connecting the main house to the large guest house (the French House). It was not until 1980, after a fire burned the top floor of the estate, that the president of the university announced the property would be restored to its original condition and used as a conference center.

Gray left behind him a legacy of philanthropy. He donated the property on which the Centenary Methodist Church in Winston would be built in downtown Winston-Salem and contributed to local hospitals and orphanagesl. He and his sons also contributed heavily to Wake Forest University and the University of North Carolina at Chapel Hill. At the time of his death, his holdings in R. J. Reynolds alone were valued at $12 million.

== See also ==
- Bowman Gray Stadium
