= Robert Bernecky =

Canadian computer scientist

Robert (Bob) Bernecky
- Born: January 28, 1947 (age 79)
- Citizenship: Canadian
- Education: Caltech; University of Buffalo; University of Toronto
- Alma mater: Hutchinson Central Technical High School, Buffalo, NY
- Known for: APL
- Scientific career
- Fields: Computer science
- Institutions: I.P. Sharp Associates; Reuters; Snake Island Research
- Thesis: APEX:The APL Parallel Executor - Univ of Toronto, masters

Robert (Bob) Bernecky is a Canadian computer scientist notable as a designer and implementer of APL. His APL career started at I.P. Sharp Associates (IPSA) in 1971.

Bernecky's first published APL work concerned with speeding up the iota and epsilon (index-of and membership) primitives functions by orders of magnitude. While at IPSA, he was a colleague of Roger Hui, Dick Lathwell, Eugene McDonnell, Roger Moore, Arthur Whitney, and APL inventor Ken Iverson.

He continued on after IPSA was acquired by Reuters on 1987-04-01, and left Reuters in 1990 to found Snake Island Research. He conducts research into functional array languages, APL compiler, and parallel-processing technology to this day.

Bernecky holds the Master of Science degree from the University of Toronto.
