= Soliton (disambiguation) =

A soliton is a type of self-reinforcing solitary wave.

Soliton may also refer to:

- Soliton (optics), an optical field that does not change during propagation because of a balance between nonlinear and linear effects
- Soliton (topology), a solution of a system of partial differential equations or of a quantum field theory homotopically distinct from the vacuum solution
- Soliton distribution, a type of discrete probability distribution that arises in the theory of erasure correcting codes
- Soliton Incorporated, company
- Soliton model, neurological model
