= Shared Variables =

Shared Variables are a feature of the programming language APL which allows APL programs running on one processor to share information with another processor. Although originally developed for mainframe computers, Shared Variables were also used in personal computer implementations of APL. Shared Variables could be used to control peripheral devices, or to communicate with external files, database management systems, or other users. Shared Variables were first introduced by International Business Machines Corporation (IBM) in their APL.SV software product in 1973, and are still available as of 2017, in APLs from IBM and Dyalog, for the operating systems Linux and Windows.

== Origin ==
When APL\360 was first introduced in 1968, there were no built-in means by which a user could directly access data from outside of the APL system. Thus, starting in 1969, IBM developed the shared variable facility. Following APL.SV, the IBM VS APL and APL2 program products also supported shared variables, as did the IBM 5100 line of computers.

Shared Variable Processors were available to allow APL access to the following:

- Standard operating system files (TSIO)
- Time Sharing Option (TSO) and Conversational Monitor System (CMS) command processors (AP100)
- VSAPL Stack Processor (AP101)
- VSAPL Session Manager (AP102)
- CMS Native Files (AP110)
- CMS and TSO Native Files (AP111)
- APL2 Data File Processor (AP121)
- Virtual storage access method (VSAM) Files (AP123)
- Full Screen Display Manager (AP124)
- IBM Graphical Data Display Manager (GDDM) (AP126)
- IBM Db2 (AP127)

== Subsequent uses ==
In the early 1980s, I. P. Sharp Associates, which offered a rich and advanced APL, introduced Shared Variables in their product. Many of the Shared Variable Processors available for IBM products were also written for Sharp APL, notably TSIO (called PJAM), AP124, AP126, and AP127. Further, as I. P. Sharp also offered IPSANET which allowed in-house clients of SHARP APL to be connected to the network, a Network Shared Variable Processor (NSVP) allowed programs from one mainframe site to access another. NSVP predates the widespread use of the Internet by five years.

Shared Variables were one technique used by APL implementors and vendors to increase the richness of the APL language, doing so without changing the core implementation. With the advent of more powerful personal computing, the exodus of the APL user community to smaller computers was inevitable. APL was first available on Intel 8008, 8080, and Zilog Z80 based hardware, later the original IBM PC, and as of 2015, on the 32- and 64-bit Linux and Windows workstations. Although Dyalog APL included an implementation of shared variables for communication with the now-deprecated Microsoft Windows Dynamic Data Exchange (DDE), only IBM continued to use Shared Variables as a means to supply new features to their versions of the APL2 language for non-mainframe computers.

Nearly all other APL vendors chose to implement new functions, such as access to Linux and Windows native features, graphical user interfaces, presentation graphics, database management system interfaces, and so on, more directly in their respective versions of the APL language. In modern non-IBM APL implementations, the Shared Variable interface has been largely supplanted by Component Object Model (COM), ActiveX, and .NET Framework.
