= Scientific Time Sharing Corporation =

Scientific Time Sharing Corporation (STSC)
- Company type: Private 1969-1993; Public 1993-2006
- Industry: Software, services, applications
- Founded: 1969; 56 years ago in Bethesda, Maryland, United States (as STSC)
- Founders: Dan Dyer, Burton C. Gray, Philip S. Abrams, Lawrence M. Breed; Allen J. Rose
- Fate: Acquired by JDA Software Group, July 2006
- Successor: STSC, Inc.; Manugistics Group, Inc.
- Headquarters: Rockville, Maryland, United States
- Number of locations: 30 offices
- Area served: North America; Europe
- Products: Prepackaged software
- Brands: APL*Plus
- Owner: Continental Telecom, Inc.
- Parent: Continental Telecom, Inc.
- Website: jda.com/industries/distribution-and-logistics

Scientific Time Sharing Corporation (STSC) was a pioneering timesharing and consulting service company which offered APL from its datacenter in Bethesda, MD to users in the United States and Europe.

== History ==
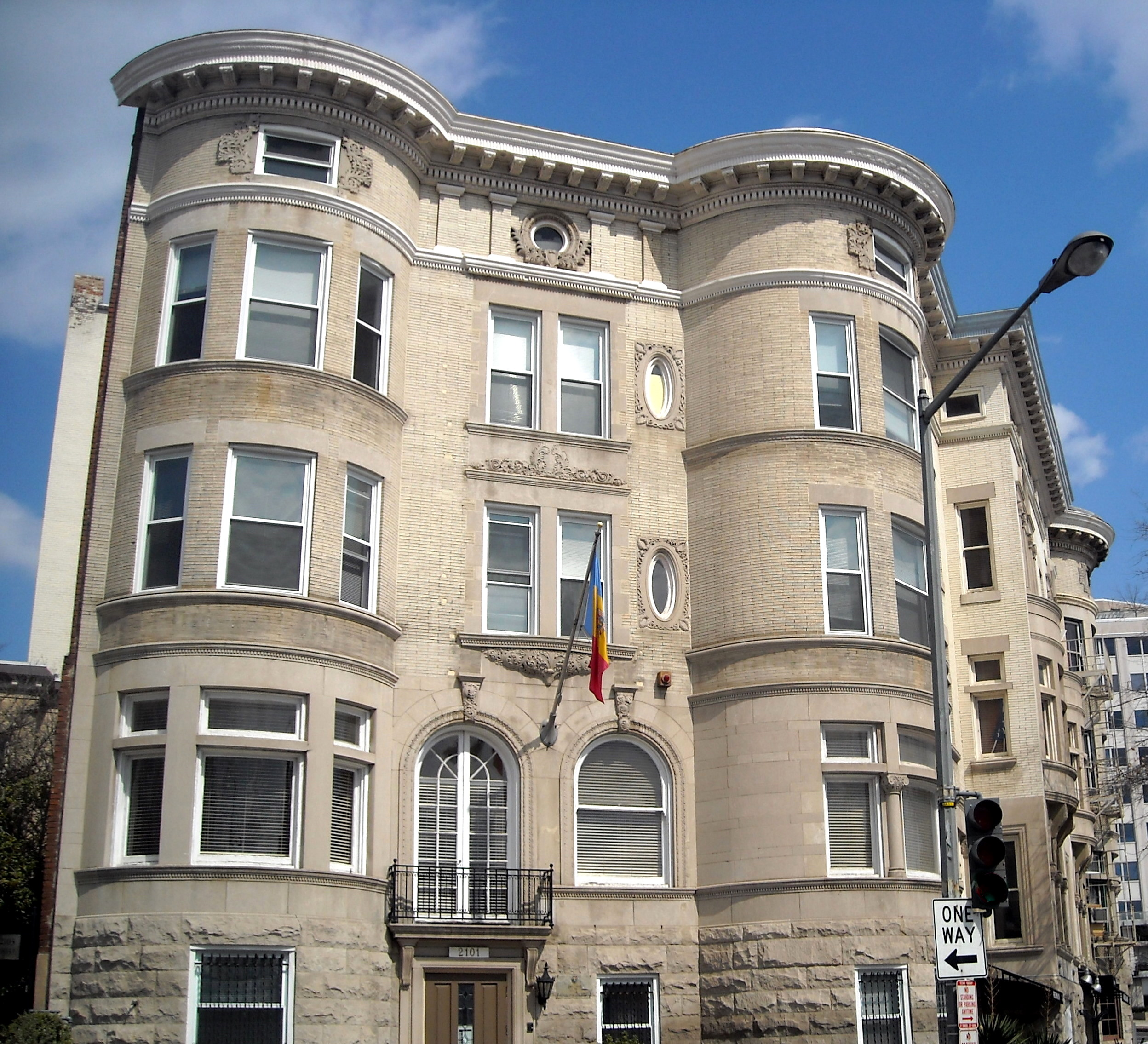
Scientific Time Sharing Corporation's former headquarters in Washington, D.C.

Scientific Time Sharing Corporation (STSC) was formed in 1969 in Bethesda, Maryland by Dan Dyer, Burton C. Gray, and some of the people who originally implemented the programming language APL, notably Philip S. Abrams, Lawrence M. Breed, and Allen Rose. In 1970, STSC released APL*Plus, a version of the APL\360 language with many practical extensions oriented toward fostering business use of APL. Together with I. P. Sharp Associates, STSC made many enhancements to the APL language, including:

- []FMT formatting
- []VR and []FX, APL program reflection features
- a file system to store APL variables outside of the APL environment

STSC continued to make enhancements to the interpreter, notably improving the performance of many of the primitive functions.

In 1985, Dan Dyer of STSC and Ian Sharp of I. P. Sharp Associates jointly received the Kenneth E. Iverson Award for Outstanding Contribution to APL.

In the early 1980s, the timesharing market began collapsing, mostly due to the appearance in the marketplace of relatively lower cost IBM mainframe computers, such as the IBM 4300. STSC quickly changed its focus to supply APL services for in-house and the rapidly developing personal computer (PC) market.

In 1982, STSC released APL*Plus/PC, which was a very successful APL interpreter for the IBM personal computer. In the mid 1980s, STSC developed the APL*Plus/Unix interpreter, a full 32-bit interpreter which was the basis of further APL development, notably APL*Plus/386, which was later available for Intel 386 class machines and higher. Arguably, the APL*Plus/386 interpreter fostered the exodus of APL applications from mainframe to PC environments, as the hardware and software were finally correctly matched to facilitate a straightforward migration of medium- to large-sized applications away from mainframes.

In the mid 1980s, STSC released an APL compiler for its APL*Plus add-on for the IBM VSAPL program product. Along with language features designed to profile code execution, this compiler implementation was oriented toward replacing resource-consuming functions in place with compiled ones, leading to overall performance improvements.

By the mid 1990s, the APL*Plus/386 system had become one of the leading APL interpreters in the market, however it did not run under the then-new Microsoft Windows 3.1. Although there were some attempts at Windows interoperability, development on the APL*Plus/Win product began shortly before the APL products were sold to LEX2000. This latest Windows product is the basis for the current APLNow (formerly APL2000) interpreter product line.

== Timeline ==
- 1969 – Scientific Time Sharing Corporation formed
- 1971 – APL Mailbox, also called 666 BOX, an early email system by Larry Breed and Francis Bates
- 1976 – STSC Mailbox used to coordinate the Jimmy Carter presidential campaign
- 1979 – the firm name was changed to STSC, Inc.
- 1982 – APL*Plus/PC launched, one of the first versions of APL on the personal computer
- 1982 – acquired by Continental Telecom, Inc.
- 1990 – acquired Rover Technology Co.
- 1992 – name changed to Manugistics Group, Inc.
- 1993 – initial public offering
- 1995 – the APL product line was sold to LEX2000, Inc.
- 1999 – Cognos Corporation acquired LEX2000

Manugistics continued to own all supply chain software.

== See also ==
- Kenneth Iverson
