= Soliton Incorporated =

- Company type: Private
- Industry: Software
- Predecessor: I. P. Sharp Associates
- Founded: 1993; 32 years ago in Toronto, Ontario, Canada
- Founders: Clarke Bruce
- Headquarters: Toronto, Ontario, Canada
- Area served: North America; Europe; Asia; Australia
- Key people: Clarke Bruce CEO
- Products: Sharp APL; TimeSquare database; Related products, services
- Parent: Reuters Group plc

Soliton Incorporated is a Canadian company formed in 1993 to continue supporting and developing the programming language Sharp APL, and related products and services, originally developed by Canadian company I. P. Sharp Associates.

== History ==
Soliton was formed in 1993 in Toronto, Ontario, Canada with Clarke Bruce as president, and with some of the former employees of I. P. Sharp Associates. The business was in some ways a continuation of parts of I. P. Sharp, which was bought by Reuters Group in 1987. Reuters was interested mainly in Sharp's historic databases, and allowed some parts of the business to buy themselves out from Reuters.

== Timeline ==
- 1987 – I. P. Sharp Associates is bought by Reuters
- 1993 – Soliton Incorporated is founded
- 1997 – Soliton develops TimeSquare, a timeseries database with an SQL-like syntax
- 2006 – TimeSquare business sold to SunGard, becoming part of their referencePoint EDM business

== See also ==
- Kenneth E. Iverson
- Eugene McDonnell
