= I. P. Sharp Associates =

- Company type: Private
- Industry: Computer software, time-sharing, consulting, services
- Predecessor: Ferranti, Ferranti-Packard
- Founded: December 1964; 61 years ago in Toronto, Ontario, Canada
- Founders: Ian Sharp et al.
- Defunct: 2005
- Fate: Acquired by Reuters Group 1987; Closed by Reuters Group 2005
- Successor: Soliton Incorporated
- Headquarters: Toronto, Canada
- Number of locations: 59 offices (1983)
- Area served: North America; Europe; Asia; Australia
- Products: Sharp APL (language); APL Plus (language); IPSANET (packet network); 666 Box (mainframe email)
- Owner: Reuters Group

I. P. Sharp Associates (IPSA) was a major Canadian computer time-sharing, consulting and services firm of the 1970s and 1980s. IPSA is well known for its work on the programming language APL, an early packet switching computer network named IPSANET, and a mainframe computer-based email system named 666 Box, stylized as 666 BOX. It was purchased in 1987 by Reuters Group, which used them until 2005 as a data warehousing center for business data.

== History ==
The company's founders worked as a team at the Toronto division of Ferranti, Ferranti-Packard, which sold many products to the Canadian military and large businesses. The team worked on operating system and compiler design for the company's range of mainframe computers, the Ferranti-Packard 6000. In 1964 Ferranti sold off its computing division to International Computers and Tabulators, which almost immediately closed the Toronto office. Ian Sharp, the chief programmer, founded I. P. Sharp Associates in December 1964 with the other members of the team (Roger Moore, Ted McDorman, Don Smith, David Oldacre, Brian Daly, and James McSherry) and David Butler shortly after.

The firm began with contract programming on IBM System/360 series mainframes, and to some degree took over Ferranti's former military work. It became particularly well used by the Canadian Navy, setting up an office in Ottawa near DND headquarters. Ted McDorman and Jim McSherry were lead players in this. At one point IPSA could claim to have played a part in every computer system onboard Canadian Navy ships.

In the early years, IPSA collaborated with its sister company Scientific Time Sharing Corporation (STSC) of Bethesda, Maryland, USA, each retailing the same services in their respective countries. IPSA and STSC jointly developed their software. Eventually they devised separate product names. They separated as Sharp APL and APL*Plus. Initially, IPSA served STSC's customers from its Toronto datacenter. In 1972, STSC built its own datacenter. Afterward, both firms provided disaster recovery for each other: if one of the datacenters could not function, the other datacenter would accommodate both vendors' users.

== Timesharing and IPSANET ==
IPSA sold time on its mainframes by the minute to customers across Canada, and rapidly developed into a major time sharing service in the 1970s. Long before the Internet, IPSA developed IPSANET to provide cheap telecommunications between the Toronto data center and IPSA clients across North America and Europe. Packet-switching also made their transatlantic links much more usable, since on previous equipment, frequent "line hits" would produce user-visible errors. As the network grew, and as Sharp APL was available on in-house computers, Sharp clients with their own mainframes could join the network, access their own or the Toronto mainframe from anywhere on IPSANET, and transfer data accordingly. The network eventually provided "Network Shared Variables" that allowed programs running on one mainframe to communicate in realtime with programs on another mainframe. This was used for file transfer and email services.

I. P. Sharp Associates offered timesharing users access to a variety of databases, plus sophisticated packages for statistical analysis, forecasting, reporting, and graphing data. Databases included historical stock market time series data, econometric data, and airline data. All of these were available from the 39 MAGIC workspace, an easy-to-use time series, query, and reporting language, which among other things featured integrated high-quality business graphics from Superplot. In 1982, IPSA produced its first printed catalog of all online databases and proceeded to document for its customers the content and use of single databases or sets of databases.

== Hardware ==
I. P. Sharp Associates Limited opened a Computer Products Division in Carleton Place, Ontario. One of their 19 inch rack products was a Control Unit to drive sixteen displays with DMA refresh speed for Transport Canada. These supported the Air Traffic Controllers and provided status of runway sensors and weather data etc.

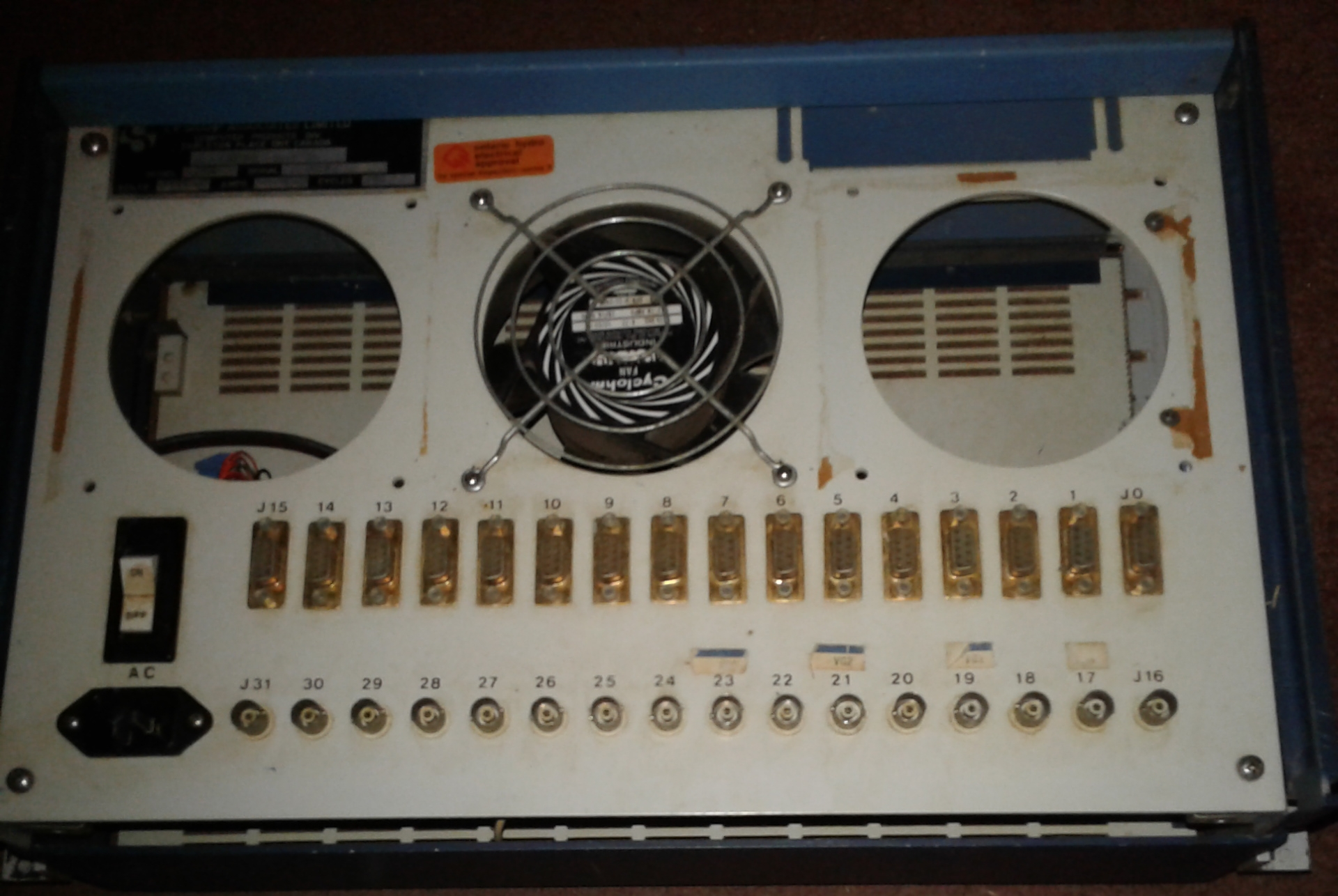
I.P.S Video Control Unit Model 300B

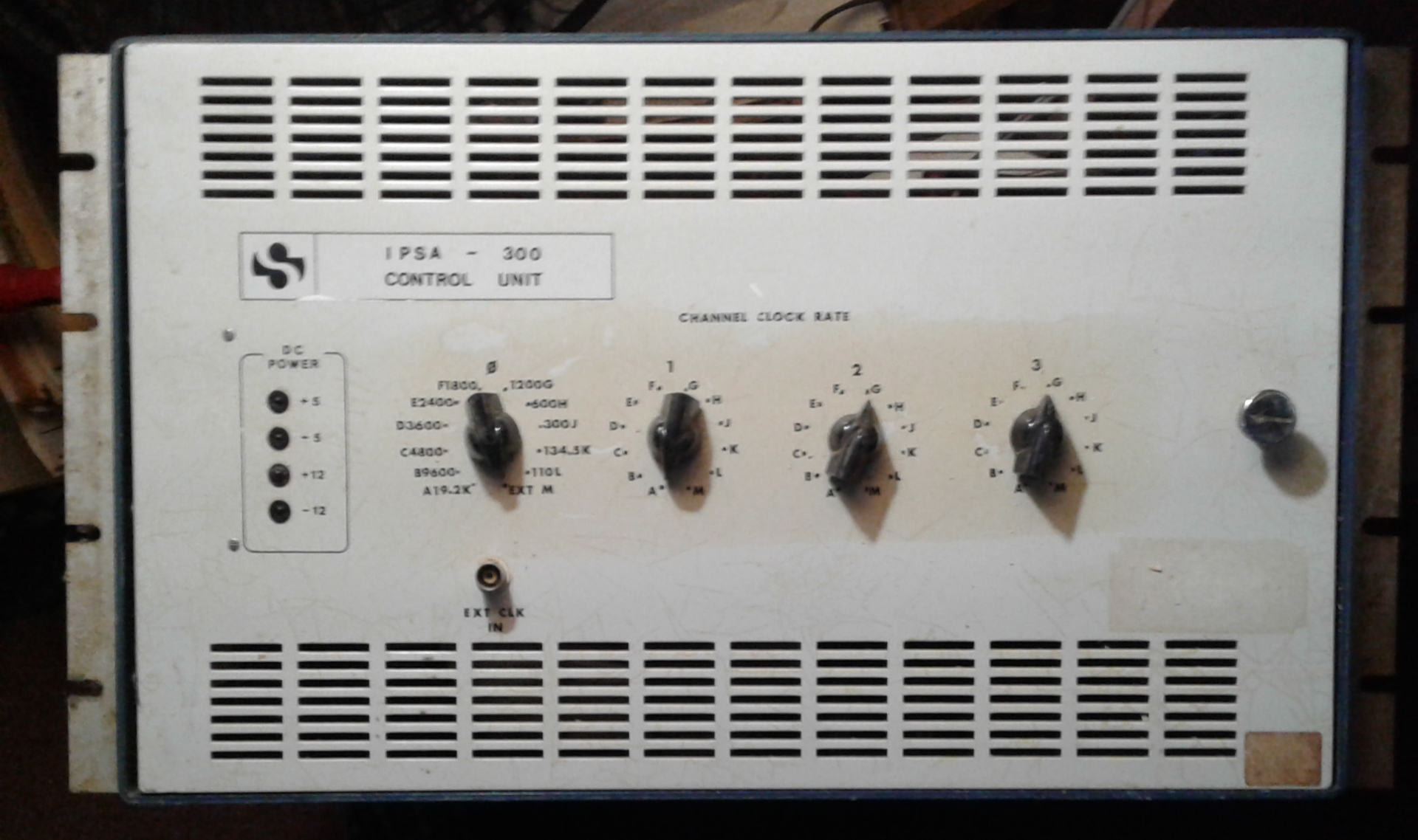

== APL implementors ==
IPSA was heavily involved in the development of the APL language, eventually employing APL's inventor, Ken Iverson, in the early 1980s. Roger Moore, a company co-founder and vice-president, won the 1973 Grace Murray Hopper Award for the development of APL\360 (along with Larry Breed and Dick Lathwell). APL\360 was later greatly enhanced and extended to become Sharp APL, stylized as SHARP APL.

IPSA employed a team of expert APL implementors and contributors at its head office in Toronto: including Ian Sharp, in his role as enabler, Roger Moore, Dick Lathwell, Brian Daly in his role as marketing guy in Ottawa, Bob Bernecky, Leigh O. Clayton, Doug Forkes, Dave Markwick, and Peter Wooster. This group was headed by Eric B. Iverson, Ken Iverson's son. It was affectionately termed the "Zoo" and was well-respected inside and outside the firm. The term "Zoo" is attributed to a visitor from The Establishment who witnessed the long hair, beards, and unconventional dress of some in the team. Sharp APL and APL Plus, and variants, were all based on the XM6 IBM program. Further extensive APL development was done in Toronto and elsewhere.

Later, in the 1980s, a branch office in Palo Alto, California, managed by Paul L. Jackson, made significant contributions to APL and later J. This office included Joey Tuttle, Roland Pesch, and Eugene McDonnell.

666 Box, written in APL, was one of the first commercial email services, known colloquially by its users as the "Sharp Mailbox". The original 666 Box was written by Larry Breed of STSC. It was later rewritten for higher security by a student hacker from Lower Canada College, Leslie H. Goldsmith. Eventually it was extended to support transferring email among multiple domains (mainframes) over the IPSANET.

== Rise of the personal computer ==
The profitable timesharing business started to deteriorate in mid-1982, as some key timesharing clients moved their operations from timesharing to in-house Sharp APL. Around that time, IBM started offering smaller mainframes, such as the IBM 4300 series, which could be leased for less than the cost of using external services. Clients who did not depend on the network were the first to migrate to small mainframes. Initially, the presence of the IBM PC posed little threat to the timesharing industry as the computing power and storage capacity offered by these small machines was insufficient. A major part of Sharp's business was buttressed by database business, which had the beneficial effect of delaying the eventual downslide. STSC started to feel the effects of the deteriorating timesharing market one or two years earlier.

Sharp was active in the field of developing APL interpreters for the IBM PC and other computers. Their IBM PC implementation was based on a software IBM System/370 emulator, written by Roger Moore, which ran the mainframe Sharp APL executable on the PC. This product was only used by users exposed to mainframe Sharp APL, never enjoying the commercial success of STSC's APL*Plus/PC product. Sharp also offered their APL interpreter for PC-XT/370 hardware, essentially an IBM PC/XT with IBM 370 hardware emulation cards, but the PC/370 hardware never caught on. Later, Sharp released the SAX (Sharp APL for Unix) interpreter, based on STSC's APL*Plus UNX interpreter, which was a much more complete implementation of Iverson's APL extensions. As of 2016, SAX is available from Soliton Incorporated.

Reuters purchased I. P. Sharp Associates in 1987, partly for the historic financial data. Ian Sharp continued as president until 1989, when he retired. In 1993, IPSA's APL Software Division was purchased by its employees from Reuters and renamed Soliton. Reuters closed the Toronto facility in 2005.

== People ==
IPSA served an important role as an incubator for entrepreneurs and technologists, including:

- Bob Bernecky – founded Snake Island Research
- Clarke Bruce – founded Soliton Inc.
- Gitte Christensen – founded Insight Systems ApS; CEO of Dyalog Ltd.
- Lib Gibson – launched Sympatico ISP; CEO of Raft Mobile Systems; CEO of Bell Globemedia Interactive
- Leslie Goldsmith – founded Affinity Systems
- Rob Hodgkinson – co-founded Financial Market Software Consultants with Paul Phillips (below)
- Roger Hui – developed the programming language J with Ken Iverson
- Hugh Hyndman – founded Affinity Systems
- Eric Iverson – founded Jsoftware Inc.
- Rohan Jayasekera – founded the Sympatico Internet service
- Morten Kromberg – founded Insight Systems ApS; CTO and CXO of Dyalog Ltd.
- W.H. Lidington – founded Beyond 20/20 Inc.
- Jane Minett – founded the Sympatico Internet service
- Roland Pesch – principal at Cygnus Solutions
- Paul Phillips - co-founded Financial Market Software Consultants with Rob Hodgkinson (above)
- Richard Proctor – founded APL Borealis Inc.
- Scott Remborg – founded the Sympatico Internet service
- Morgan Smyth – founded Braegen Inc.
- Stephen Taylor – writer, editor, poet, founder of the Iverson College conferences
- Arthur Whitney – founded Kx Systems; developed the programming languages A+, k, and q

== Timeline ==
- 1964 – I. P. Sharp Associates formed
- 1970 – Dominant player in timesharing business
- 1978 – Arrival of Amdahl V8, high performance IBM 370 alternative
- 1980 – Sharp APL available as an in-house product
- 1984 – Sharp APL for the PC available
- 1987 – Acquisition by Reuters
- 1993 – Soliton formed
- 2005 – Reuters closes Toronto facility

== See also ==
- STSC: US APL timesharing company
- Soliton Incorporated: Continuation of I. P. Sharp software business
