= Lathwell =

Lathwell is a surname. Notable people with the surname include:

- Mark Lathwell (born 1971), English cricketer
- Richard H. Lathwell, computer scientist
