= Iverson Award =

The Iverson Award, more formally the Kenneth E. Iverson Award for Outstanding Contribution to APL, is presented by the Special Interest Group on APL (SIGAPL) of the Association for Computing Machinery (ACM). It is presented to a person who has made significant contributions to the APL programming language or to the APL community. These contributions may be Technical (i.e. new developments in the APL language itself) or Service (assistance or support to SIGAPL or the APL community generally). The award consists of a plaque and a certificate, and is accompanied by a cash prize and a lifetime membership in SIGAPL.

The award is named in honor of Kenneth E. Iverson, the creator of APL.

Recipients of the award by year:

- 2016 Morten Kromberg and Gitte Christensen
- 2007 IBM APL2 Products and Services Team
- 2001 Jon McGrew
- 2000 Lynne Shaw
- 1999 William Rutiser
- 1998 Roy Sykes, Jr.
- 1997 John C. McPherson
- 1996 Roger Hui
- 1995 Peter Donnelly and John Scholes
- 1994 Donald B. McIntyre (geologist)
- 1993 James A. Brown
- 1991 Phil Abrams
- 1990 Ray Polivka
- 1989 Philip Van Cleave
- 1988 Al Rose (Allen J. Rose)
- 1987 Eugene McDonnell
- 1986 Raymond Tisserand, Clark Wiedmann, and Alex Morrow
- 1985 Dan Dyer and Ian Sharp
- 1984 Garth Foster
- 1983 Adin Falkoff

== See also ==
- List of computer-related awards
