= Polymorphic Programming Language =

Interactive, extensible programming language type

The Polymorphic Programming Language (PPL) was developed in 1969 at Harvard University by Thomas A. Standish. It is an interactive, extensible language with a base language similar to the language APL.

The assignment operator <- (or ←) has influenced the language S.
