= Black Rock Beacon =

American festival newspaper

The Black Rock Beacon
- All the news that's fit to burn.
- Type: Daily newspaper
- Format: Print
- Founder(s): Lawrence M. Breed, etc.
- Founded: 2005 in Black Rock, Nevada
- City: Black Rock City, Nevada
- Country: United States
- Sister newspapers: Black Rock Gazette
- Website: blackrockbeacon.org
- Free online archives: https://blackrockbeacon.org/home/

The Black Rock Beacon is a newspaper made by and for burners, or fans and attendees of the annual Burning Man festival in Nevada. It was started in 2005 by former staff members of the Black Rock Gazette when that newspaper no longer received funding from Burning Man LLC. It continues to publish annually. The newspaper aims to publish daily editions during the annual Burning Man event. The print paper is ad-free and is funded through donations, with all of its content is made available under a Creative Commons license.

== History ==
=== Creation from the Gazette: 2005 ===
The Black Rock Beacon was started in 2005 by former staff members of the Black Rock Gazette when that newspaper ceased to receive funding from the Burning Man LLC to cover the annual Burning Man event in Black Rock City, Nevada. This event is viewed in contrary ways by both parties. While the Beacon founders said they were effectively fired, the Burning Man organization claims it and the Gazette staff mutually decided to pursue "separate missions." On its official website in 2023, Burning Man continued to host a 2005 statement describing the split as resulting from a situation where "the journalistic needs of the publisher and editorial staff have not always remained well-aligned. In 2005, after publishing the spring Black Top Gazette, the two groups decided to pursue separate missions... dedicated Gazette staff created the Black Rock Beacon as a completely participant-driven publication. As an independent publication, the editors of the Beacon naturally enjoy full journalistic license to cover the news in Black Rock City without any oversight by the Burning Man Project." The Gazette, in turn, in 2005 became a one-page broadsheet. Previously, the Black Rock Gazette had taken several forms as a community newspaper, operated in part by participants and in part by the Burning Man organization.

=== Yearly editions: 2006-2024 ===
In 2007, the paper continued to be published during the 8-day festival in August.

In 2009, after an unprecedented 130 theme camps were denied reserved campsites by the Burning Man Organization, the Black Rock Beacon published an "Alternative What Where When" guide at Burning Man. Unplaced camps were able to list their addresses and events in the AWWW in a manner similar to that for placed camps in Black Rock City's official What Where When publication.

In 2012, Mitchell Martin served as the Black Rock Beacon editor, quoting for The Guardian that year that it was estimated scalpers had snatched around 15,000 Burning Man tickets, although the estimate was rough. In September 2017, the Wall Street Journal described a "newspaper war" occurring between Burning Man journalists, noting that the Black Rock Beacon had held holding morning news meetings for that August's events, in one case delayed by dust storms.

The Beacon did not publish from 2020 through 2023, largely because of the Covid pandemic. Three issues appeared in 2024.

== Business model ==
The newspaper aims to publish daily editions during the annual Burning Man event. The Black Rock Beacon itself is ad-free and is funded through donations, though the paper does accept advertising on its web site. All of its content is made available under a Creative Commons license.

== Notable contributors ==
- Lawrence M. Breed (July 17, 1940 - May 16, 2021), co-founder, director, chief copy editor.
- Ron Garmon, director, reporter.
