= Eugene McDonnell =

American computer scientist and mathematician

Eugene Edward McDonnell
- Eugene McDonnell in 1978
- Born: October 18, 1926
- Died: August 17, 2010 (aged 83); Palo Alto, California, USA
- Citizenship: United States
- Education: University of Kentucky; Harvard University
- Known for: Programming languages: APL, J
- Spouse: Jeanne Farr McDonnell
- Children: 5
- Awards: Kenneth E. Iverson Award for Outstanding Contribution to APL, 1987
- Scientific career
- Fields: Computer science
- Institutions: Western Union; IBM; I. P. Sharp Associates

Eugene Edward McDonnell (October 18, 1926 – August 17, 2010) was a computer science pioneer and long-time contributor to the programming language siblings APL and J.

He was a graduate of Brooklyn Technical High School. After serving as an infantry corporal in the U.S. Army in World War II, he attended the University of Kentucky, graduating in 1949 summa cum laude, and was elected to Phi Beta Kappa. He was awarded a First Year Graduate Fellowship to Harvard University, where he studied comparative literature, particularly Dante's Divine Comedy.

Studying the poems of Robert Frost, he noticed that the first two poems in Frost's book West-Running Brook, "Spring Pools" and "The Freedom of the Moon", not only discuss reflecting, but the rhyme schemes of the two reflect each other: AABCBC and CBCBAA. When he met Frost, he was delighted to find that they had both committed the 193 lines of John Milton's "Lycidas" to memory.

His first work at IBM was in the design of IBM's first time-sharing system, which became a very early host to IVSYS (for Iverson system), a predecessor of APL. In 1968, he became a colleague of Ken Iverson, used Iverson notation before APL was named, and was active in the very earliest days of APL. He holds U.S. patent 3,400,376 (3 September 1968) "Information Transfer Control System" allowing communication between two users. In 1978, he left IBM and joined I. P. Sharp Associates, retiring therefrom in 1990.

At IBM, McDonnell devised the notation for the signum and circle functions in APL, designed the complex floor function, and proposed the extension of or and and to GCD and LCM. With Iverson he was responsible for including hooks and forks in J. The result of zero divided by zero in J is as he proposed in 1976. In 1987, he won the Iverson Award.

McDonnell was the publisher of the APL Press, producing "A Source Book in APL" and "APL Quote Quad, the Early Years". He was the editor and principal contributor of the Recreational APL column in APL Quote-Quad for many years. He wrote dozens of the "At Play with J" columns in Vector, the journal of the British APL Association. He contributed to Sloane's On-Line Encyclopedia of Integer Sequences.

He was a member of the Jane Austen Society of North America (JASNA), and gave a talk "Classical Persuasion" at the JASNA meeting at Lake Louise in 1993. He was active in the Bay area Jane Austen group, and wrote a topical index to the Dierdre Le Faye edition of Austen's letters, which can be seen at the Republic of Pemberley website.

McDonnell died peacefully at his home in Palo Alto on August 17, 2010.

== Conference Papers ==
- IBM69 Boston, A Formal Description of JCL
- APL73 Toronto, The Variety of Alternative Definitions of a Simple Function
- APL73 Copenhagen, Complex Floor
- APL74 Anaheim, The Caret Functions
- APL75 Pisa, A Notation for the GCD and LCM Functions
- APL76 Ottawa, Zero Divided By Zero
- IBM78 Los Altos, organizer
- APL79 Rochester, NY, Fuzzy Residue
- APL80 Noordwijkerhout, Netherlands, Extending APL to Infinity, with Jeffrey Shallit
- IPSA80 Toronto, Commercial Applications for Event Handling
- APL81 San Francisco, conference chairman
- APL84 Helsinki, APL award
- APL86 Manchester, UK, A Perfect Square Root Routine
- APL87 Dallas, Iverson Award
- APL88 Sydney, Life: Nasty, Brutish, and Short
- APL89 NYC, Phrasal Forms, with Kenneth E. Iverson (introduces hooks and forks)
- APL90 Copenhagen, APL\?, with Roger Hui, Kenneth E. Iverson, and Arthur Whitney (introduces J)
- APL91 Stanford, conference organizer
- APL93 Toronto, From Trees Into Boxes, with David Steinbrook
