= Edward H. Sussenguth =

American engineer (1932 - 2015)

Edward H. Sussenguth Jr.
- Born: October 10, 1932; Holyoke, Massachusetts, United States
- Died: November 22, 2015 (aged 83); Amelia Island, Florida, United States
- Education: B.A.; Harvard University (1954); M.S.; MIT (1959); Ph.D.; Harvard (1964)
- Engineering career
- Discipline: Electrical engineering Computer engineering
- Institutions: United States Navy; IBM
- Projects: Systems Network Architecture (SNA); IBM Advanced Computer System (ACS)
- Awards: Fellow, IEEE; IBM Fellow; IEEE Simon Ramo Medal; Member, National Academy of Engineering

Edward H. Sussenguth Jr. (October 10, 1932 – November 22, 2015) was an American engineer and former IBM employee, known best for his work on Systems Network Architecture (SNA). He was also a contributor to the architecture of IBM's Advanced Computer System (ACS).

== Biography ==
Born in Holyoke, Massachusetts, Sussenguth received a Bachelor of Arts (A.B.) in 1954 from Harvard University, a Master of Science (M.S.) in electrical engineering in 1959 from Massachusetts Institute of Technology (MIT), and a Doctor of Philosophy (Ph.D.) in 1964 from Harvard.

After he served at the United States Navy as an officer in the Pacific Fleet, Sussenguth joined IBM in 1959. Sussenguth started in 1959 in the Research Division in the development of formal language descriptions.

This work led to Sussenguth meeting Kenneth E. Iverson and Adin Falkoff. Iverson had developed a formal notation, which was documented in a book A Programming Language. It was the original version of the programming language APL. Chapter 2 of A Programming Language had used Iverson's notation to describe the IBM 7090 computer. In early 1963, Falkoff, later joined by Iverson and Sussenguth, proceeded to use the notation to produce a formal description of the IBM System/360 computer then under design. The result was published in 1964 in a double issue of the IBM Systems Journal, thereafter known as the "grey book" or "grey manual". The book was used in a course on computer systems design at the IBM Systems Research Institute.

In 1965, Sussenguth joined the IBM Advanced Computer Systems project (ACS-1) to work on high performance computers. In 1970, he became Director of Architecture and Planning in the new Communications Systems Division, where he turned his attention to networking and high speed communications. In the last year before his retirement in 1990, he was appointed first President of the IBM Academy of Technology, which he held for a year.

Sussenguth was an advisor to the National Bureau of Standards and a visiting professor at some universities. He was elected Fellow of the Institute of Electrical and Electronics Engineers (IEEE) and received multiple awards and honors, including: in 1981, an IBM Fellowship for "technical leadership in the development of system network architecture"; in 1988, the Data Communications Interface Award; in 1989, the IEEE Simon Ramo Medal; in 1992, he was elected a member of the National Academy of Engineering (computer science).

== Publications ==
Sussenguth has authored and co-authored multiple publications, including:

- Sussenguth Jr., Edward H. (1963). "Use of tree structures for processing files". Communications of the ACM. 6 (5): 272–279. doi:10.1145/366552.366600. S2CID 16260819.
- Salton, Gerard; Sussenguth Jr., Edward H. (April 21–23, 1964). "Some flexible information retrieval systems using structure matching procedures". Proceedings of the Spring Joint Computer Conference. Association for Computing Machinery (ACM).
- Sussenguth, Edward H. (1965). "A Graph-Theoretic Algorithm for Matching Chemical Structures". Journal of Chemical Documentation. 5 (1): 36–43. doi:10.1021/c160016a007.
- Jarema, David R.; Sussenguth Jr., Edward H. (1981). "IBM data communications: a quarter century of evolution and progress" (PDF). IBM Journal of Research and Development. 25 (5): 391–404. doi:10.1147/rd.255.0391.
