= Philip S. Abrams =

American computer scientist

Philip S. Abrams Ph.D.
- Citizenship: United States
- Education: Ph.D. computer science, Stanford University 1970; M.S. computer science, Stanford University 1966; A.B. mathematics, Princeton University 1964
- Known for: Programming language APL
- Awards: Kenneth E. Iverson Award for Outstanding Contribution to APL
- Scientific career
- Fields: Computer science; Business technology
- Institutions: Talisman Ltd.; BuildTopia, Inc.; KeepMore, Inc.; Kanisa Inc.; Netword LLC; Qualitas, Inc.; CMS/Data Corporation; Health Innovations, Inc.; Information Builders, Inc.; Princeton Venture Research, Inc.; Cogito Data Systems, Inc.; STSC, Inc.; Sligos, S.A.; IBM Research

Philip S. Abrams is a computer science researcher who co-authored the first implementation of the programming language APL.

== APL ==
In 1962, Kenneth E. Iverson published his book A Programming Language, describing a mathematical notation for describing array operations in mathematics. In 1965, Abrams and Lawrence M. Breed produced a compiler that translated expressions in Iverson's APL notation into IBM 7090 machine code. In the 1970s, he was vice president of development for Scientific Time Sharing Corporation (STSC), Inc.

== Selected works ==
- Abrams, Philip S., An APL Machine, Stanford Linear Accelerator Center (SLAC), February, 1970.
