= IPSANET =

Former packet switching network

IPSANET was a packet switching network written by I. P. Sharp Associates (IPSA). Operation began in May 1976. It initially used the IBM 3705 Communications Controller and Computer Automation LSI-2 computers as nodes. An Intel 80286 based-node was added in 1987. It was called the Beta node.

The original purpose was to connect low-speed dumb terminals to a central time sharing host in Toronto. It was soon modified to allow a terminal to connect to an alternate host running the SHARP APL software under license. Terminals were initially either 2741-type machines based on the 14.8 characters/s IBM Selectric typewriter or 30 character/s ASCII machines. Link speed was limited to 9600 bit/s until about 1984.

Other services including 2780/3780 Bisync support, remote printing, X.25 gateway and SDLC pipe lines were added in the 1978 to 1984 era. There was no general purpose data transport facility until the introduction of Network Shared Variable Processor (NSVP) in 1984. This allowed APL programs running on different hosts to communicate via Shared Variables.

The Beta node improved performance and provided new services not tied to APL. An X.25 interface was the most important of these. It allowed connection to a host which was not running SHARP APL.

IPSANET allowed for the development of an early yet advanced e-mail service, 666 BOX, which also became a major product for some time, originally hosted on IPSA's system, and later sold to end users to run on their own machines. NSVP allowed these remote e-mail systems to exchange traffic.

The network reached its maximum size of about 300 nodes before it was shut down in 1993.
