= Virtual Storage Personal Computing =

Virtual Storage Personal Computing (VSPC) was a service offered by IBM in the late 1970s and early 1980s. From a data terminal, users could run both interactive processes and batch jobs on remote computing hardware (located in IBM service centres, or in organisations' machine rooms) to which they were connected e.g. by telephone lines using modems. Among the programming languages offered were VSPC variants of BASIC, FORTRAN, APL and PL/I. VSPC became obsolete following the invention of the Personal Computer as computing power became available to the individual user locally.

Announced in 1976, VSPC was designed to be more user-friendly than IBM's Time Sharing Option, providing commands in simple English. VSPC offered users the ability to create and submit programs to an IBM (or compatible) mainframe without using punched cards, though the programs were still submitted as card images, and programs so submitted needed all the usual IBM Job Control Language (JCL) statements to access the mainframe batch submission and resource allocation processes. Output from a job submitted through VSPC could be routed to a printer, or back to the user's VSPC account, though in general the output would be too wide to be viewed easily on a VSPC terminal.

Although IBM Selectric terminals were supported (with special typeballs for APL programming), most VSPC interaction was through half-duplex IBM 3270 (and compatible) terminals. Using VSPC for APL programming required a special terminal which implemented APL symbols in addition to the usual EBCDIC characters.

VSPC was used by many large companies, including McDonald's and Lockheed Corporation. By 1984, IBM stopped VSPC development and encouraged users to switch to Time Sharing Option.
