= Roger Moore (computer scientist) =

American computer scientist (1939–2019)

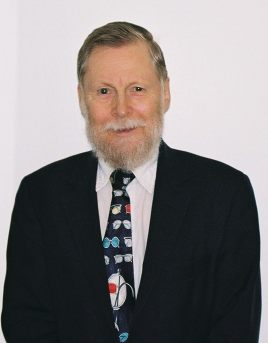
- Born: November 16, 1939; Redlands, California, United States
- Died: March 21, 2019 (aged 79); Toronto, Ontario, Canada
- Education: Stanford University (B.S. Mathematics 1963)
- Known for: Compilers: ALGOL, COBOL, APL\360; I. P. Sharp Associates (cofounder); IPSANET network
- Awards: Grace Murray Hopper Award (1973); Roy Thomson Hall Award of Recognition (2002); University of Toronto Arbor Award (2009); Opera Canada Ruby (2010)
- Scientific career
- Fields: Computer science
- Workplaces: Stanford University; Ferranti-Packard; I. P. Sharp Associates (cofounder)
- Website: www.rogerdmoore.ca

Roger D. Moore (November 16, 1939 – March 21, 2019) was the 1973 recipient (with Larry Breed and Richard Lathwell) of the Grace Murray Hopper Award from the Association for Computing Machinery (ACM). It was given "for their work in the design and implementation of APL\360, setting new standards in simplicity, efficiency, reliability and response time for interactive systems."

Moore was a cofounder of I. P. Sharp Associates and held a senior position in the company for many years. Before this, he contributed to the SUBALGOL compiler at Stanford University and wrote the ALGOL 60 compiler for the Ferranti-Packard 6000 and the ICT 1900. Along with his work on the programming language APL, he was also instrumental in the development of IPSANET, a private packet switching data network.

== At Stanford University ==
Roger D. Moore was born in Redlands, California. Before graduation, he worked as an operator of the Burroughs 220 computer at Stanford. During this time he provided some support for Larry Breed’s card stunt system. He also spent time studying the Burroughs 220 BALGOL compiler. This resulted in BUTTERFLY which was described by George Forsythe:

Each grader program was written as a BALGOL-language procedure. It was then compiled together with a procedure called BUTTERFLY, written by Moore. The result was a relocatable machine-language procedure, with a mechanism for equating its variables to variables of any BALGOL program, in just the form of the BALGOL compiler’s own machine-language library procedures (SIN, WRITE, READ, etc.).

Forsythe anticipated a problem as described by Bob Braden:

BALGOL at Stanford outlived the B220 hardware. In 1962 Stanford contracted with IBM to obtain an IBM 7090 for campus computing. This created great consternation in Forsythe’s office. A significant body of faculty and students was now familiar with BALGOL, and the high compiling speed of the BAC was vital in an academic environment. To subject this community to the production-oriented system software offered by IBM, including a slow Fortran compiler and cumbersome operating system, would have moved academic computing at Stanford backward by several years.

To address this problem, in December 1961, Moore was hired by Forsythe to work on the SUBALGOL compiler for the IBM 7090. Braden and Breed were hired soon afterward.

After completion of SUBALGOL, he was hired by Ferranti-Packard to write an ALGOL 60 compiler for the FP6000. This compiler was part of the software package which are included in the sale of the FP6000 to International Computers and Tabulators.

== At I. P. Sharp Associates ==
In December 1964 most employees of Ferranti-Packard's computer group were laid off. Along with six other former FP employees he formed I. P. Sharp Associates. He was vice-president from incorporation to his retirement in 1989.

In 1966 he, Larry Breed and Richard Lathwell began work on the APL\360 interpreter.

Lastly, APL\360 owes much of its superior time-sharing performance to Roger D. Moore, of I.P. Sharp Associates, Toronto, who was principally responsible for the supervisor. Its design has not been described to the extent it deserves. This team received the Grace Murray Hopper Award from the Association for Computing Machinery (ACM). It was given: "For their work in the design and implementation of APL\360, setting new standards in simplicity, efficiency, reliability and response time for interactive systems."

In 1970, Moore became project leader of IPSA's speculative DOS/360 COBOL compiler project. Although the compiler had satisfactory performance, the market did not accept it.

IPSA offered APL time-sharing service starting in 1969. By 1975, the inflexibility and communication error intolerance of time-division multiplexing were no longer tolerable. He became the chief architect of the IPSANET packet switching computer network. In 1976 this system was deployed in North America and London.

In 1984, IPSA released Sharp APL for the IBM PC. This package included a 370 emulator written by Moore.

== Retirement ==
After retiring from IPSA in early 1989, he became interested in opera and chamber music. Along with attending many performances, he has supported concerts, commissions and advanced music education. He died in Toronto on March 21, 2019.

== Compositions funded ==
Moore has funded the composing of many works.

- Dean Burry Sword in the Schoolyard (2016)
- Xiaoyong Chen Talking through Distance (2014)
- John Estacio Away and Awake in the Night (2013)
- Larysa Kuzmenko Piano Concerto (2002)
- Marjan Mozetich Scales of joy and sorrow (2007)
- Michael Oesterle Rambler Rose (2014)
- Norbert Palej Cloud Light (2013)
- Randolph Peters The Seven Gates of Kur (2000)
- Erik Ross Dark (2007)
- R. Murray Schafer Trio for Violin, Cello and Piano (2013)
- Nick Storring Gardens (2014)

== Awards ==
- "Grace Murray Hopper Award (1973)". Archived from the original on April 2, 2013.
- "Roy Thomson Hall Award of Recognition (2002)".
- "University of Toronto Arbor Award (2009)".
- "Opera Canada Ruby (2010)". May 12, 2022.

== Publications ==
- ""An Implementation of Algol 60 for the FP6000"". Proceedings of Computing and Data Processing Society of Canada 4th National Conference. University of Toronto Press. 1964.
- Breed, Lawrence M.; Moore, Roger D. (November 1970). "Errors and fixes in the APL/360 Program Product". ACM SIGPLAN Notices. 5 (11): 33. doi:10.1145/987461.987467. S2CID 28611594.
- ""A Data Communications System for the APL User"" (PDF). APL Users Meeting. 1978.
- Major Network Change (PDF). Vol. 9. January 21, 2022.
- ""Network Management Tools"". APL Users Meeting Proceedings. Vol. 1. 1982.
