= Republic of Pemberley =

The Republic of Pemberley is an online community dedicated to the appreciation of the work of the English author Jane Austen. The site was established shortly after the release of the 1995 BBC adaptation of Austen's novel, Pride and Prejudice, and takes its name from the estate owned by the hero Fitzwilliam Darcy. The website was co-founded by Myretta Robens and Amy Bellinger. It is the largest online Jane Austen fansite and had an average of 8 million to 10 million hits per month as of 2007. In 2000, there were one million page views of its fan-fiction area each year, and most of their fanfic authors are female. Stories based on Pride and Prejudice dominate the site as it is the most popular Austen work.

The website contains chat rooms and bulletin boards and reproduces Austen's novels in their entirety, annotated with hyperlinks and augmented by discussion boards, allowing readers to make connections between various parts of Austen's writings as well as interact with fellow readers.

When screenwriter Andrew Davies met with some American women from the Republic of Pemberley, he said "They were all most insistent on the point that it is unresolved sexual tension that makes for a romantic drama."
