= Lawrence M. Breed =

Computer scientist and early Burning Man contributor

Lawrence (Larry) Moser Breed
- Born: July 17, 1940; Stanford, California, United States
- Died: May 16, 2021 (aged 80); Palo Alto, California, US
- Education: B.S, Stanford University, 1961; M.S., Stanford University, 1965
- Known for: Implementation of Iverson Notation (APL); Scientific Time Sharing Corporation (cofounder)
- Awards: Grace Murray Hopper Award, 1973
- Scientific career
- Fields: Computer science
- Workplaces: IBM; Scientific Time Sharing Corporation

Lawrence Moser "Larry" Breed (July 17, 1940 – May 16, 2021) was a computer scientist, artist and inventor, best known for his involvement in the programming language APL.

== Career ==
As an undergraduate at Stanford University in 1961, he created the first computer animation language and system and used it at Stanford football half-times to coordinate images produced by a 100 ft-by-100 ft array of rooters holding up colored cards.

As a graduate student at Stanford, he corresponded with APL's inventor, Ken Iverson, to correct the formal description of the IBM System/360 which used Iverson's notation. He received his M.S. from Stanford in 1965, under academic supervisor Niklaus Wirth. He then joined Iverson's group at IBM's Thomas J. Watson Research Center in Yorktown Heights, New York. In 1965 he and Philip S. Abrams created the first implementation of APL, written in FORTRAN on an IBM 7090.

He later created APL implementations for an experimental IBM Little Computer, and the IBM 360 in 1966, and for the IBM 1130.

Breed was the 1973 recipient (with Dick Lathwell and Roger Moore) of the Grace Murray Hopper Award from the Association for Computing Machinery "for their work in the design and implementation of APL\360, setting new standards in simplicity, efficiency, reliability and response time for interactive systems."

With Dan Dyer and others he co-founded Scientific Time Sharing Corporation in 1969, where he led the development of the APL PLUS time-sharing system. While there, in 1972, he and Francis Bates III wrote one of the world's first worldwide email systems, named Mailbox.

Breed rejoined IBM in 1977. He helped develop the International Organization for Standardization (ISO) APL standard, then joined IBM efforts to port Berkeley Software Distribution (BSD) Unix onto IBM platforms. He worked on compilers for the programming language C, floating-point arithmetic standardization, and radix conversion, until retiring in 1992.

== Retirement ==
Breed became a significant contributor to the Burning Man event, under the playa name of Ember. He coined the term "MOOP" (matter out of place), and conceived and built the first trash fence to capture windborne debris. He created the spiraling, flaming sculpture "Chaotick", the playa’s longest-running art piece besides the Man himself, and built artistic bicycle light effects. He edited and proofread the Black Rock Gazette newspaper, a role in which he continued as a co-founder and director of its successor the Black Rock Beacon, and edited other Burning Man materials. As co-founder of the Earth Guardians, Breed promoted the "Leave No Trace" ethos, particularly in post-event cleanup.

In 1973 and 1974 he took first place, with co-solver Donna Breed, in the Dictionary Rally.

== Gray-B-Gone and Evapotrons ==
Associated with his Burning Man activities, Breed devised the Gray-B-Gon and the Evapotron evaporators for graywater disposal, and through Bay Area workshops directed construction, by Burning Man campers, of over 100 units, as of 2012.

== Publications ==
- — (August 1970). "The APL Plus File System". Proceedings of SHARE. Vol. 35. p. 392. OCLC 554296375.
- — (July 1971). "Generalizing APL scalar extension". ACM SIGPLAN Notices. 6 (5): 12–14. doi:10.1145/1115904.1115906. S2CID 40788922.
- "Evapotrons". Archived from the original on July 16, 2017.
