= Jim Brown (computer scientist) =

American computer scientist

James A. Brown
- Born: December 23, 1943 (age 82)
- Citizenship: United States
- Education: PhD
- Known for: APL2; SmartArrays (cofounder)
- Awards: Kenneth E. Iverson Award for Outstanding Contribution to APL
- Scientific career
- Fields: Computer software management
- Institutions: IBM; SmartArrays (cofounder)
- Website: www.smartarrays.com

James A. Brown was manager of the group within IBM responsible for the programming language APL2 program product. APL2 was first available on IBM mainframe computers in 1980, and was later available under Linux, Unix, and Windows. In 1993, Brown received the Kenneth E. Iverson Award for Outstanding Contribution to APL from the Association for Computing Machinery.

In 1996, he left IBM to become a consultant and entrepreneur. In 1999, Brown co-founded SmartArrays, Inc. with James Wheeler, and has held a senior position in the company for many years. The firm develops specialized analytic software based on columnar databases, with memory-resident vector processing, for uses where customers consider commercial off-the-shelf software to be more expensive, slow, or limited. Note: SmartArrays ceased operations and the corporation was dissolved as of February 2019.

In November 2016, on the occasion of the 50th anniversary of the APL workspace 1 CLEANSPACE, Brown published and presented the paper "A Personal History of APL" which describes how he became involved with APL and some information on the early days of APL not available elsewhere.
