= Adin Falkoff =

American computer engineer (1921–2010)

Adin D. Falkoff
- Born: December 19, 1921; New Jersey, United States
- Died: August 13, 2010 (aged 88); Pleasantville, New York
- Education: B.Ch.E., City College of New York, 1941; M.A. Mathematics, Yale University, 1963
- Known for: Engineering and design of programming language APL with Kenneth E. Iverson
- Spouse: Dr. Linda D. Misek-Falkoff
- Scientific career
- Fields: Computer engineering; Computer science
- Institutions: IBM; Yale University

Adin D. Falkoff (19 December 1921 – 13 August 2010) was an engineer and computer systems and programming systems designer who was mostly known for his work on the programming language APL and systems for IBM.

== Career ==
Falkoff, born in New Jersey, received a Bachelor of Engineering (B.Ch.E.) from the City College of New York in 1941, and a Master's degree (M.A.) in Mathematics from Yale University in 1963.

He was a researcher and manager at IBM Research since 1955 for over forty years before retiring. He collaborated with Ken Iverson from 1960 to 1980 on the design, development, and use of the APL programming language and interactive environment.

Of special note is his landmark article, A Formal Description of System/360, describing the then new IBM System/360 computer system, formally, in APL programming notation.

Falkoff was a visiting member of the faculty of IBM's Systems Research Institute, and taught computer science at Yale University. He was one of the researchers who established and managed the IBM Philadelphia Scientific Center and received many awards for his work, especially with APL.

== Representative publications ==
- Adin D. Falkoff, "Algorithms for Parallel-Search Memories". Journal of the ACM 9:4:488-511 (1962)
- Adin D. Falkoff, Kenneth E. Iverson, Edward H. Sussenguth Jr., "A Formal Description of System/360". IBM Systems Journal 3:3:198-262 (1964)
- Falkoff, A.D., and K.E. Iverson, APL\360 User’s Manual, IBM Corporation, August 1968. full text in PDF
- Falkoff, A.D., and K.E. Iverson, "The Design of APL", IBM Journal of Research and Development 17:4, July 1973. full text in PDF
- Falkoff, A.D., and K.E. Iverson, "The Evolution of APL", ACM SIGPLAN Notices 13:8, August 1978. full text in PDF
- Falkoff, A.D., and K.E. Iverson, A Source Book In APL, APL Press, 1981
- Falkoff, A.D., "The IBM Family of APL Systems", IBM Systems Journal 30:4, December 1991. full text in PDF
