= IBM Journal of Research and Development =

- Discipline: Information systems
- Language: English
- Edited by: Cliff Pickover

Publication details
- History: 1957–2020
- Publisher: IBM
- Frequency: Bimonthly
- Impact factor: 1.266 (2019)

Standard abbreviations
- ISO 4: IBM J. Res. Dev.

Indexing
- ISSN: 0018-8646 (print); 0018-8646 (web)

Links
- Journal homepage; Online access

IBM Journal of Research and Development is a former, peer-reviewed bimonthly scientific journal covering research on information systems. This Journal has ceased production in 2020. According to the Journal Citation Reports in 2019, the journal had an impact factor of 1.27.

IBM also published the IBM Systems Journal (ISSN 0018-8670) starting in 1962; it ceased publication in 2008 and was absorbed in part by the IBM Journal of Research and Development.
