= Richard H. Lathwell =

Richard (Dick) Henry Lathwell was the 1973 recipient (with Larry Breed and Roger Moore) of the Grace Murray Hopper Award from the Association for Computing Machinery.

"For their work in the design and implementation of APL/360, setting new standards in simplicity, efficiency, reliability and response time for interactive systems."
