= Andrew Gordon =

Andrew Gordon may refer to:

- Andrew Gordon (historian), American historian of Japanese history
- Andrew Gordon (ice hockey) (born 1985), Canadian hockey player
- Andrew Gordon (naval historian) (born 1951), British naval historian
- Andrew Gordon (racing driver) (born 1990), American racing driver
- Andy Gordon, American television producer and writer
- Andrew Gordon (Benedictine) (1712–1751), Scottish Benedictine monk, physicist, and inventor
- Andrew Gordon (British Army officer) (died 1806), British general
- Andy Gordon (footballer) (born 1944), Scottish footballer
- Andrew D. Gordon, British computer scientist
- Andrew P. Gordon (born 1962), US District Judge from Nevada
- Andrew Gordon, half of 21st-century American husband-and-wife novelist duo Ilona Andrews
