= Explicit multi-threading =

Explicit Multi-Threading (XMT) is a computer science paradigm for building and programming parallel computers designed around the parallel random-access machine (PRAM) parallel computational model. A more direct explanation of XMT starts with the rudimentary abstraction that made serial computing simple: that any single instruction available for execution in a serial program executes immediately. A consequence of this abstraction is a step-by-step (inductive) explication of the instruction available next for execution. The rudimentary parallel abstraction behind XMT, dubbed Immediate Concurrent Execution (ICE) in Vishkin (2011), is that indefinitely many instructions available for concurrent execution execute immediately. A consequence of ICE is a step-by-step (inductive) explication of the instructions available next for concurrent execution. Moving beyond the serial von Neumann computer (the only successful general-purpose platform to date), the aspiration of XMT is that computer science will again be able to augment mathematical induction with a simple one-line computing abstraction.

The random-access machine (RAM) is an abstract machine model used in computer science to study algorithms and complexity for standard serial computing. The PRAM computational model is an abstract parallel machine model that had been introduced to similarly study parallel algorithms and complexity for parallel computing, when they were yet to be built. Researchers have developed a large body of knowledge of parallel algorithms for the PRAM model. These parallel algorithms are also known for being simple, by standards of other approaches to parallel algorithms.

This large body of parallel algorithms knowledge for the PRAM model and their relative simplicity motivated building computers whose programming can be guided by these parallel algorithms. Since productivity of parallel programmers has long been considered crucial for the success a parallel computer, simplicity of algorithms is important.

Multi-core computers are built around two or more processor cores integrated on a single integrated circuit die. They are widely used across many application domains including general-purpose computing. Explicit Multi-Threading (XMT) is a computing paradigm for building and programming multi-core computers with tens, hundreds or thousands of processor cores.

Experimental work published in 2011 and 2012 demonstrates significantly greater speedups for advanced PRAM algorithms on XMT prototypes than for the same problems on state-of-the-art multi-core computers.

Work published in 2018 shows that lock-step parallel programming (using ICE) can achieve the same performance as the fastest hand-tuned multi-threaded code on XMT systems. Such inductive lock-step approach stands in contrast to multi-threaded programming approaches of many other core systems that are known for challenging programmers.

The XMT paradigm was introduced by Uzi Vishkin.

== The main levels of abstraction of XMT ==
The Explicit Multi-Threading (XMT) computing paradigm integrates several levels of abstraction.

The work-time (WT) (sometimes called work-depth) framework, introduced by Shiloach & Vishkin (1982), provides a simple way for conceptualizing and describing parallel algorithms. In the WT framework, a parallel algorithm is first described in terms of parallel rounds. For each round, the operations to be performed are characterized, but several issues can be suppressed. For example, the number of operations at each round need not be clear, processors need not be mentioned and any information that may help with the assignment of processors to jobs need not be accounted for. Second, the suppressed information is provided. The inclusion of the suppressed information is, in fact, guided by the proof of a scheduling theorem due to Brent (1974). The WT framework is useful since while it can greatly simplify the initial description of a parallel algorithm, inserting the details suppressed by that initial description is often not very difficult. For example, the WT framework was adopted as the basic presentation framework in the parallel algorithms books (for the PRAM model) JaJa (1992) and Keller, Kessler & Traeff (2001), as well as in the class notes Vishkin (2009). Vishkin (2011) explains the simple connection between the WT framework and the more rudimentary ICE abstraction noted above.

The XMT paradigm can be programmed using XMTC, a parallel multi-threaded programming language which is a small extension of the programming language C. The XMT paradigm include a programmer's workflow that starts with casting an algorithm in the WT framework and proceeds to programming it in XMTC.

The XMT multi-core computer systems provides run-time load-balancing of multi-threaded programs incorporating several patents. One of them generalizes the program counter concept, which is central to the von Neumann architecture to multi-core hardware.

== XMT prototyping and links to more information ==
In January 2007, a 64-processor computer named Paraleap, that demonstrates the overall concept was completed. The XMT concept was presented in Vishkin et al. (1998) and Naishlos et al. (2003) and the XMT 64-processor computer in Wen & Vishkin (2008). Since making parallel programming easy is one of the biggest challenges facing computer science today, the demonstration also sought to include teaching the basics of PRAM algorithms and XMTC programming to students ranging from high-school Torbert et al. (2010) to graduate school.

Experimental work reported in Caragea & Vishkin (2011) for the Maximum flow problem, and in two papers by Edwards and Vishkin (2012a, 2012b) for the Graph Connectivity (Connectivity (graph theory)), Graph Biconnectivity (biconnected graph) and Graph Triconnectivity (Triconnected component) problems demonstrated that for some of the most advanced algorithms in the parallel algorithmic literature, the XMT paradigm can offer 8 times to over 100 times greater speedups than for the same problems on state-of-the-art multi-core computers. Each reported speedup was obtained by comparing clock cycles on an XMT prototype relative to the fastest serial algorithm running on the fastest serial machines.

XMT prototyping was culminated in Ghanim, Vishkin & Barua (2018), establishing that lock-step parallel programming (using ICE) can achieve the same performance as the fastest hand-tuned multi-threaded code on XMT systems. This 2018 result sharpens the contrast between XMT programming and the multi-threaded programming approaches employed by nearly all many other-core systems, whose race conditions and other demands tend to challenge, and sometimes even fail programmers Vishkin (2014).
