= XMT =

XMT can refer to:

- Extensible MPEG-4 Textual Format, an XML-based file format for storing MPEG-4 data in a way suitable for further editing
- Explicit multi-threading, a parallel computing paradigm designed around the parallel random-access machine
- Cray XMT - a multithreaded supercomputing architecture, the successor to the Cray MTA-2
- 8-hydroxyfuranocoumarin 8-O-methyltransferase, an enzyme
