= Embedded Supercomputing =

Embedded Supercomputing (EmbSup) a relatively new solution which targets fine grain and coarse grain parallelism altogether. This combination thought to be a best way for exploiting fine and coarse grain parallelism by targeting fine grain parallelism towards FPGAs and coarse grained parallelism towards super computers or clusters.

Basically Embedded Supercomputing is a hybrid network of CPU and FPGA hardware, where FPGA acts as external co-processor to CPU. However, this programming model is still evolving and has many challenges.

== Programming Model for EmbSup ==
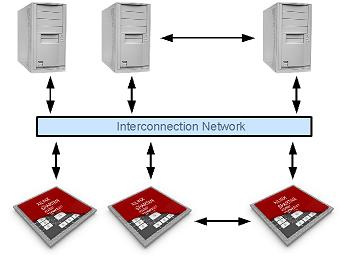
Embedded Supercomputing
