= Pregel =

Pregel may refer to:

- Pregolya (German: Pregel), a river in the Russian Kaliningrad Oblast exclave
- Pregel, a Google large-scale graph processing bulk synchronous parallel extension
