= LogP =

LogP may refer to:

- the logarithm of the partition coefficient, in the physical sciences
- LogP machine, a model for parallel computation

== See also ==
- p-adic logarithm function
