= Bridging model =

Model in computer science

In computer science, a bridging model is an abstract model of a computer which provides a conceptual bridge between the physical implementation of the machine and the abstraction available to a programmer of that machine; in other words, it is intended to provide a common level of understanding between hardware and software engineers.

A successful bridging model is one which can be efficiently implemented in reality and efficiently targeted by programmers; in particular, it should be possible for a compiler to produce good code from a typical high-level language. The term was introduced by Leslie Valiant's 1990 paper A Bridging Model for Parallel Computation, which argued that the strength of the von Neumann model was largely responsible for the success of computing as a whole. The paper goes on to develop the bulk synchronous parallel model as an analogous model for parallel computing.
