= Automatic mutual exclusion =

Parallel computing paradigm

Automatic mutual exclusion is a parallel computing programming paradigm in which threads are divided into atomic chunks, and the atomic execution of the chunks automatically parallelized using transactional memory.

== See also ==
- Bulk synchronous parallel
