= Andrew D. Gordon =

British computer scientist

- Born: United Kingdom
- Education: Ph.D., University of Cambridge, 1992
- Known for: Concurrent Haskell; Spi calculus ambient calculus SecPAL
- Scientific career
- Fields: computer science
- Institutions: Cogna; Department of Computer Science and Technology, University of Cambridge; University of Edinburgh; Microsoft Research
- Thesis: Functional programming and input/output (1992)
- Website: www.cogna.co

Andrew D. Gordon is a British computer scientist employed by software synthesis company Cogna as Chief Science Officer and by the University of Cambridge. Formerly, he worked for Microsoft Research. His research interests include programming language design, formal methods, concurrency, cryptography, and access control.

== Biography ==
Gordon earned a Ph.D. from the University of Cambridge in 1992. Until 1997, Gordon was a Research Fellow at the University of Cambridge Computer Laboratory. He then joined the Microsoft Research laboratory in Cambridge, England, where he was a principal researcher in the Programming Principles and Tools group. He also holds a professorship at the University of Edinburgh.

He is employed as Chief Science Officer for software synthesis company Cogna, and by the University of Cambridge.

== Research ==
Gordon is one of the designers of Concurrent Haskell, an extension to the functional programming language Haskell, which added explicit primitive data types for concurrency, and then became a library named Control.Concurrent as part of the Glasgow Haskell Compiler. He is the co-designer with Martin Abadi of Spi calculus, a π-calculus extension, for formalized reasoning about cryptographic systems. He and Luca Cardelli invented the ambient calculus for reasoning about mobile code. With Moritz Y. Becker and Cédric Fournet, Gordon also designed SecPAL, a Microsoft specification language for access control policies.

== Awards and honours ==
Gordon's Ph.D. thesis, Functional programming and input/output, won the 1993 Distinguished Dissertation Award of the British Computer Society. His 2000 paper on the ambient calculus subject with Luca Cardelli, "Anytime, Anywhere: Modal Logics for Mobile Ambients", won the 2010 SIGPLAN Most Influential POPL Paper Award.
