= J. Eliot B. Moss =

American computer scientist

J. Eliot B. Moss is an American computer scientist active in the fields of garbage collection and multiprocessor synchronization. He is co-inventor with Maurice Herlihy of transactional memory.

He is currently (2012) a Professor of computer science at University of Massachusetts Amherst. He has served on the executive committee of SIGPLAN, the Special Interest Group for programming languages for the Association for Computing Machinery. In 2007 he was inducted as Fellow of the ACM, and in 2008 as a Fellow of the IEEE. In 2012, his paper on transactional memory was recognized with a Dijkstra Prize, shared with Maurice Herlihy.

He is also an Episcopal priest, ordained in 2005, currently serving as Vicar of St. John's Episcopal Church, Ashfield, MA. He resides in Amherst, MA, is married, and has a son and a daughter. He received degrees from the Massachusetts Institute of Technology, completing a BSEE in 1975, MSEE in 1978, and PhD in 1981. His dissertation was on nested transactions and was later published in a slightly revised form by the MIT Press (1985). He is co-author of The Garbage Collection Handbook with Richard Jones and Antony Hosking, published in 2011 by Chapman and Hall.

== See also ==
- ISCA Influential Paper Award
