= Transactional memory =

Type of concurrency control mechanism

In computer science and engineering, transactional memory attempts to simplify concurrent programming by allowing a group of load and store instructions to execute in an atomic way. It is a concurrency control mechanism analogous to database transactions for controlling access to shared memory in concurrent computing. Transactional memory systems provide high-level abstraction as an alternative to low-level thread synchronization. This abstraction allows for coordination between concurrent reads and writes of shared data in parallel systems.

== Motivation ==
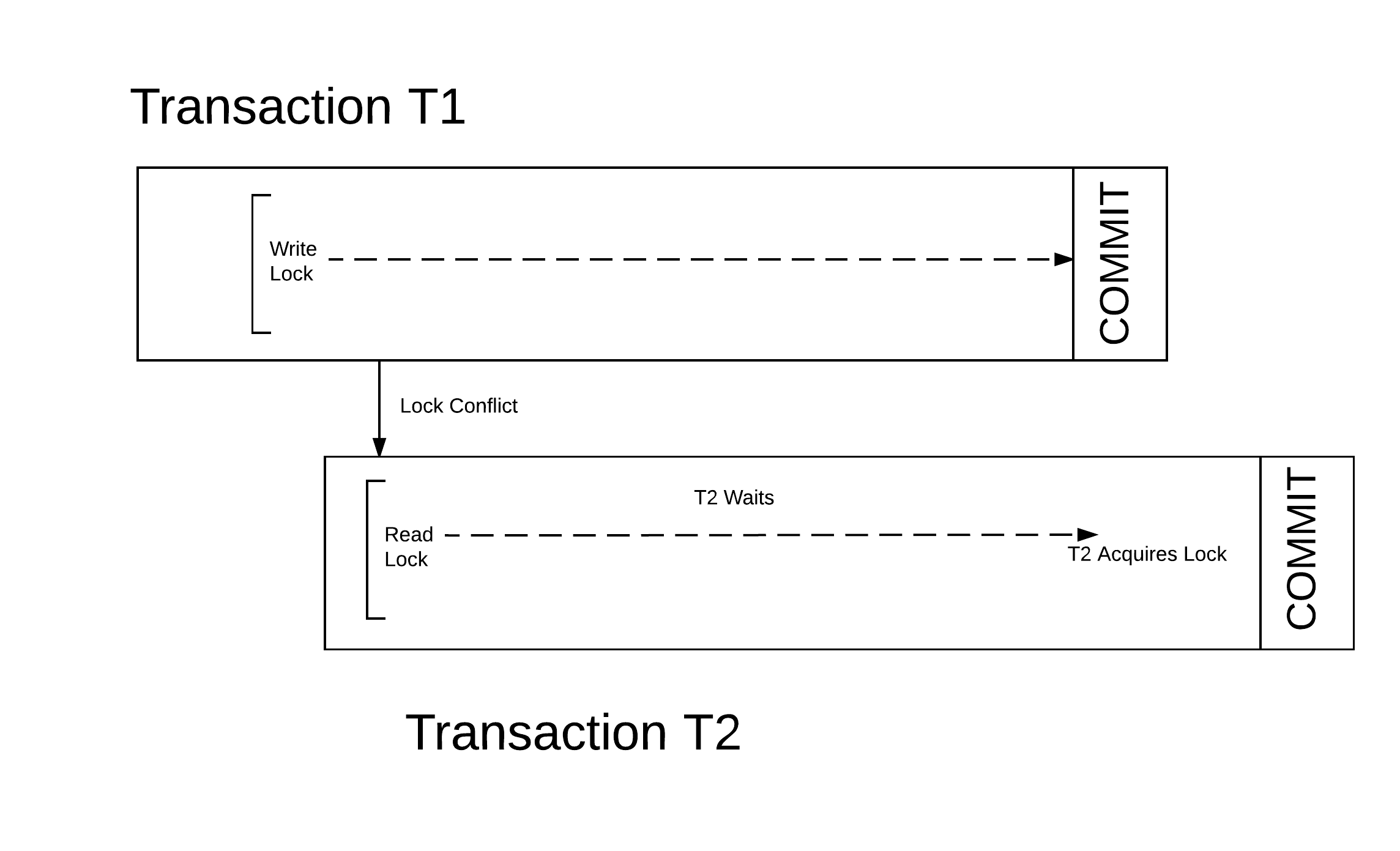
Atomicity between two parallel transactions with a conflict

In concurrent programming, synchronization is required when parallel threads attempt to access a shared resource. Low-level thread synchronization constructs such as locks are pessimistic and prohibit threads that are outside a critical section from running the code protected by the critical section. The process of applying and releasing locks often functions as an additional overhead in workloads with little conflict among threads. Transactional memory provides optimistic concurrency control by allowing threads to run in parallel with minimal interference. The goal of transactional memory systems is to transparently support regions of code marked as transactions by enforcing atomicity, consistency and isolation.

A transaction is a collection of operations that can execute and commit changes as long as a conflict is not present. When a conflict is detected, a transaction will revert to its initial state (prior to any changes) and will rerun until all conflicts are removed. Before a successful commit, the outcome of any operation is purely speculative inside a transaction. In contrast to lock-based synchronization where operations are serialized to prevent data corruption, transactions allow for additional parallelism as long as few operations attempt to modify a shared resource. Since the programmer is not responsible for explicitly identifying locks or the order in which they are acquired, programs that utilize transactional memory cannot produce a deadlock.

With these constructs in place, transactional memory provides a high-level programming abstraction by allowing programmers to enclose their methods within transactional blocks. Correct implementations ensure that data cannot be shared between threads without going through a transaction and produce a serializable outcome. For example, code can be written as:

class Account:
    def __init__(self, id: int, balance: float, name: str) -> None:
        self.id: int = id
        self.balance: float = balance
        self.name: str = name

def transfer_money(from_account: Account, to_account: Account, amount: float) -> None:
    """
    Transfer money from one account to another.
    """
    with transaction():
        from_account.balance -= amount
        to_account.balance += amount

In the code, the block defined by "transaction" is guaranteed atomicity, consistency and isolation by the underlying transactional memory implementation and is transparent to the programmer. The variables within the transaction are protected from external conflicts, ensuring that either the correct amount is transferred or no action is taken at all. Note that concurrency related bugs are still possible in programs that use a large number of transactions, especially in software implementations where the library provided by the language is unable to enforce correct use. Bugs introduced through transactions can often be difficult to debug since breakpoints cannot be placed within a transaction.

Transactional memory is limited in that it requires a shared-memory abstraction. Although transactional memory programs cannot produce a deadlock, programs may still suffer from a livelock or resource starvation. For example, longer transactions may repeatedly revert in response to multiple smaller transactions, wasting both time and energy.

== Hardware vs. software ==
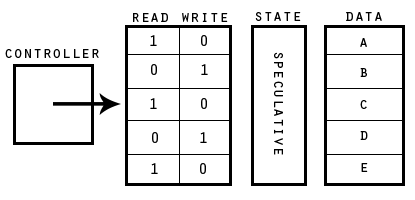
Hardware transactional memory using read and write bits

The abstraction of atomicity in transactional memory requires a hardware mechanism to detect conflicts and undo any changes made to shared data. Hardware transactional memory systems may comprise modifications in processors, cache and bus protocol to support transactions. Speculative values in a transaction must be buffered and remain unseen by other threads until commit time. Large buffers are used to store speculative values while avoiding write propagation through the underlying cache coherence protocol. Traditionally, buffers have been implemented using different structures within the memory hierarchy such as store queues or caches. Buffers further away from the processor, such as the L2 cache, can hold more speculative values (up to a few megabytes). The optimal size of a buffer is still under debate due to the limited use of transactions in commercial programs. In a cache implementation, the cache lines are generally augmented with read and write bits. When the hardware controller receives a request, the controller uses these bits to detect a conflict. If a serializability conflict is detected from a parallel transaction, then the speculative values are discarded. When caches are used, the system may introduce the risk of false conflicts due to the use of cache line granularity. Load-link/store-conditional (LL/SC) offered by many RISC processors can be viewed as the most basic transactional memory support; however, LL/SC usually operates on data that is the size of a native machine word, so only single-word transactions are supported. Although hardware transactional memory provides maximal performance compared to software alternatives, limited use has been seen at this time.

Software transactional memory provides transactional memory semantics in a software runtime library or the programming language, and requires minimal hardware support (typically an atomic compare and swap operation, or equivalent). As the downside, software implementations usually come with a performance penalty, when compared to hardware solutions. Hardware acceleration can reduce some of the overheads associated with software transactional memory.

Owing to the more limited nature of hardware transactional memory (in current implementations), software using it may require fairly extensive tuning to fully benefit from it. For example, the dynamic memory allocator may have a significant influence on performance and likewise structure padding may affect performance (owing to cache alignment and false sharing issues); in the context of a virtual machine, various background threads may cause unexpected transaction aborts.

== History ==
One of the earliest implementations of transactional memory was the gated store buffer used in Transmeta's Crusoe and Efficeon processors. However, this was only used to facilitate speculative optimizations for binary translation, rather than any form of speculative multithreading, or exposing it directly to programmers. Azul Systems also implemented hardware transactional memory to accelerate their Java appliances, but this was similarly hidden from outsiders.

Sun Microsystems implemented hardware transactional memory and a limited form of speculative multithreading in its high-end Rock processor. This implementation proved that it could be used for lock elision and more complex hybrid transactional memory systems, where transactions are handled with a combination of hardware and software. The Rock processor was canceled in 2009, just before the acquisition by Oracle; while the actual products were never released, a number of prototype systems were available to researchers.

In 2009, AMD proposed the Advanced Synchronization Facility (ASF), a set of x86 extensions that provide a very limited form of hardware transactional memory support. The goal was to provide hardware primitives that could be used for higher-level synchronization, such as software transactional memory or lock-free algorithms. However, AMD has not announced whether ASF will be used in products, and if so, in what timeframe.

More recently, IBM announced in 2011 that Blue Gene/Q had hardware support for both transactional memory and speculative multithreading. The transactional memory could be configured in two modes; the first is an unordered and single-version mode, where a write from one transaction causes a conflict with any transactions reading the same memory address. The second mode is for speculative multithreading, providing an ordered, multi-versioned transactional memory. Speculative threads can have different versions of the same memory address, and hardware implementation keeps track of the age for each thread. The younger threads can access data from older threads (but not the other way around), and writes to the same address are based on the thread order. In some cases, dependencies between threads can cause the younger versions to abort.

Intel's Transactional Synchronization Extensions (TSX) is available in some of the Skylake processors. It was earlier implemented in Haswell and Broadwell processors as well, but the implementations turned out both times to be defective and support for TSX was disabled. The TSX specification describes the transactional memory API for use by software developers, but withholds details on technical implementation. ARM architecture has a similar extension.

As of GCC 4.7, an experimental library for transactional memory is available which utilizes a hybrid implementation. The PyPy variant of Python also introduces transactional memory to the language.

C++ has a "Transactional Memory Technical Specification" (TM TS) which is an experimental fork of the language implementing transactional memory as a core feature of the language. It introduces "atomic blocks" (either all statements occur or nothing occurs) and "synchronized blocks" (executed in single total order with all synchronized blocks). It introduces the following keywords:

- atomic_cancel: Declares an atomic block that rolls back on exception.
- atomic_commit: Declares an atomic block that commits on exception.
- atomic_noexcept: Declares an atomic block that aborts on exception.
- synchronized: Declares a synchronized block that executes in single total order with all synchronized blocks. Compare with Java synchronized blocks, which have a "monitor object" or "intrinsic lock", and where only one thread can execute a specific section of code.
- transaction_safe: Declares a function to be transaction-safe.
- transaction_safe_dynamic: Declares a virtual function to be transaction-safe.

The last known working draft was a revision made in 2026.

== Software transactional memory ==
In computer science, software transactional memory (STM) is a concurrency control mechanism analogous to database transactions for controlling access to shared memory in concurrent computing. It is an alternative to lock-based synchronization. STM is a strategy implemented in software, rather than as a hardware component. A transaction in this context occurs when a piece of code executes a series of reads and writes to shared memory. These reads and writes logically occur at a single instant in time; intermediate states are not visible to other (successful) transactions. The idea of providing hardware support for transactions originated in a 1986 paper by Tom Knight. The idea was popularized by Maurice Herlihy and J. Eliot B. Moss. In 1995, Nir Shavit and Dan Touitou extended this idea to software-only transactional memory (STM). Since 2005, STM has been the focus of intense research and support for practical implementations is growing.

=== Performance ===
Unlike the locking techniques used in most modern multithreaded applications, STM is often very optimistic: a thread completes modifications to shared memory without regard for what other threads might be doing, recording every read and write that it is performing in a log. Instead of placing the onus on the writer to make sure it does not adversely affect other operations in progress, it is placed on the reader, who after completing an entire transaction verifies that other threads have not concurrently made changes to memory that it accessed in the past. This final operation, in which the changes of a transaction are validated and, if validation is successful, made permanent, is called a commit. A transaction may also abort at any time, causing all of its prior changes to be rolled back or undone. If a transaction cannot be committed due to conflicting changes, it is typically aborted and re-executed from the beginning until it succeeds.

The benefit of this optimistic approach is increased concurrency: no thread needs to wait for access to a resource, and different threads can safely and simultaneously modify disjoint parts of a data structure that would normally be protected under the same lock.

However, in practice, STM systems also suffer a performance hit compared to fine-grained lock-based systems on small numbers of processors (1 to 4 depending on the application). This is due primarily to the overhead associated with maintaining the log and the time spent committing transactions. Even in this case performance is typically no worse than twice as slow. Advocates of STM believe this penalty is justified by the conceptual benefits of STM.

Theoretically, the worst case space and time complexity of n concurrent transactions is O(n). Actual needs depend on implementation details (one can make transactions fail early enough to avoid overhead), but there will also be cases, albeit rare, where lock-based algorithms have better time complexity than software transactional memory.

=== Conceptual advantages and disadvantages ===
In addition to their performance benefits, STM greatly simplifies conceptual understanding of multithreaded programs and helps make programs more maintainable by working in harmony with existing high-level abstractions such as objects and modules. Lock-based programming has a number of well-known problems that frequently arise in practice:

- Locking requires thinking about overlapping operations and partial operations in distantly separated and seemingly unrelated sections of code, a task which is very difficult and error-prone.
- Locking requires programmers to adopt a locking policy to prevent deadlock, livelock, and other failures to make progress. Such policies are often informally enforced and fallible, and when these issues arise they are insidiously difficult to reproduce and debug.
- Locking can lead to priority inversion, a phenomenon where a high-priority thread is forced to wait for a low-priority thread holding exclusive access to a resource that it needs.

In contrast, the concept of a memory transaction is much simpler, because each transaction can be viewed in isolation as a single-threaded computation. Deadlock and livelock are either prevented entirely or handled by an external transaction manager; the programmer need hardly worry about it. Priority inversion can still be an issue, but high-priority transactions can abort conflicting lower priority transactions that have not already committed.

However, the need to retry and abort transactions limits their behavior. Any operation performed within a transaction must be idempotent since a transaction might be retried. Additionally, if an operation has side effects that must be undone if the transaction is aborted, then a corresponding rollback operation must be included. This makes many input/output (I/O) operations difficult or impossible to perform within transactions. Such limits are typically overcome in practice by creating buffers that queue up the irreversible operations and perform them after the transaction succeeds. In Haskell, this limit is enforced at compile time by the type system.

=== Composable operations ===
In 2005, Tim Harris, Simon Marlow, Simon Peyton Jones, and Maurice Herlihy described an STM system built on Concurrent Haskell that enables arbitrary atomic operations to be composed into larger atomic operations, a useful concept impossible with lock-based programming. To quote the authors:

Perhaps the most fundamental objection [...] is that lock-based programs do not compose: correct fragments may fail when combined. For example, consider a hash table with thread-safe insert and delete operations. Now suppose that we want to delete one item A from table t1, and insert it into table t2; but the intermediate state (in which neither table contains the item) must not be visible to other threads. Unless the implementor of the hash table anticipates this need, there is simply no way to satisfy this requirement. [...] In short, operations that are individually correct (insert, delete) cannot be composed into larger correct operations.
—Tim Harris et al., "Composable Memory Transactions", Section 2: Background, pg.2

With STM, this problem is simple to solve: simply wrapping two operations in a transaction makes the combined operation atomic. The only sticking point is that it is unclear to the caller, who is unaware of the implementation details of the component methods, when it should attempt to re-execute the transaction if it fails. In response, the authors proposed a retry command which uses the transaction log generated by the failed transaction to determine which memory cells it read, and automatically retries the transaction when one of these cells is modified, based on the logic that the transaction will not behave differently until at least one such value is changed.

The authors also proposed a mechanism for composition of alternatives, the orElse function. It runs one transaction and, if that transaction does a retry, runs a second one. If both retry, it tries them both again as soon as a relevant change is made. This facility, comparable to features such as the Portable Operating System Interface (POSIX) networking select() call, allows the caller to wait on any one of a number of events simultaneously. It also simplifies programming interfaces, for example by providing a simple mechanism to convert between blocking and nonblocking operations.

This scheme has been implemented in the Glasgow Haskell Compiler.

== Proposed language support ==
The conceptual simplicity of software transactional memories enables them to be exposed to the programmer using relatively simple language syntax. Tim Harris and Keir Fraser's "Language Support for Lightweight Transactions" proposed the idea of using the classical conditional critical region (CCR) to represent transactions. In its simplest form, this is just an "atomic block", a block of code which logically occurs at a single instant:

// Insert a node into a doubly linked list atomically
atomic {
    newNode->prev = node;
    newNode->next = node->next;
    node->next->prev = newNode;
    node->next = newNode;
}

When the end of the block is reached, the transaction is committed if possible, or else aborted and retried. (This is simply a conceptual example, not correct code. For example, it behaves incorrectly if node is deleted from the list during the transaction.)

CCRs also permit a guard condition, which enables a transaction to wait until it has work to do:

atomic (queueSize > 0) {
    remove item from queue and use it
}

If the condition is not satisfied, the transaction manager will wait until another transaction has made a commit that affects the condition before retrying. This loose coupling between producers and consumers enhances modularity compared to explicit signaling between threads. "Composable Memory Transactions" took this a step farther with its retry command (discussed above), which can, at any time, abort the transaction and wait until some value previously read by the transaction is modified before retrying. For example:

atomic {
    if (queueSize > 0) {
        remove item from queue and use it
    } else {
        retry
    }
}

This ability to retry dynamically late in the transaction simplifies the programming model and opens up new possibilities.

One issue is how exceptions behave when they propagate outside of transactions. In "Composable Memory Transactions", the authors decided that this should abort the transaction, since exceptions normally indicate unexpected errors in Concurrent Haskell, but that the exception could retain information allocated by and read during the transaction for diagnostic purposes. They stress that other design decisions may be reasonable in other settings.

=== Transactional locking ===
Software transactional memory can be implemented as a lock-free algorithm or it can use locking. There are two types of locking schemes: In encounter-time locking (Ennals, Saha, and Harris), memory writes are done by first temporarily acquiring a lock for a given location, writing the value directly, and logging it in the undo log. Commit-time locking locks memory locations only during the commit phase.

A commit-time scheme named "Transactional Locking II" implemented by Dice, Shalev, and Shavit uses a global version clock. Every transaction starts by reading the current value of the clock and storing it as the read-version. Then, on every read or write, the version of the particular memory location is compared to the read-version; and, if it is greater, the transaction is aborted. This guarantees that the code is executed on a consistent snapshot of memory. During commit, all write locations are locked, and version numbers of all read and write locations are re-checked. Finally, the global version clock is incremented, new write values from the log are written back to memory and stamped with the new clock version.

=== Implementation issues ===
One problem with implementing software transactional memory with optimistic reading is that it is possible for an incomplete transaction to read inconsistent state (that is, to read a mixture of old and new values written by another transaction). Such a transaction is doomed to abort if it ever tries to commit, so this does not violate the consistency condition enforced by the transactional system, but it is possible for this "temporary" inconsistent state to cause a transaction to trigger a fatal exceptional condition such as a segmentation fault or even enter an endless loop, as in the following contrived example from Figure 4 of "Language Support for Lightweight Transactions":

atomic {
    if (x != y)
        while (true) { 
        }
}

Transaction A

atomic {
    x++;
    y++;
}

Transaction B

Provided x=y initially, neither transaction above alters this invariant, but it is possible that transaction A will read x after transaction B updates it but read y before transaction B updates it, causing it to enter an infinite loop. The usual strategy for dealing with this is to intercept any fatal exceptions and abort any transaction that is not valid.

One way to deal with these issues is to detect transactions that execute illegal operations or fail to terminate and abort them cleanly; another approach is the transactional locking scheme.

== Available implementations ==
- Hardware:
  - Arm Transactional Memory Extension (TME)
  - Blue Gene/Q processor from IBM (Sequoia supercomputer)
  - IBM zEnterprise EC12, the first commercial server to include transactional memory processor instructions
  - Intel's Transactional Synchronization Extensions (TSX), available in select Haswell-based processors and later, removed in Comet Lake
  - IBM POWER8 and 9, removed in Power10 (Power ISA v.3.1)
  - Rock processor (canceled by Oracle)
- Software:
  - Haskell GHC
  - Vega 2 from Azul Systems
  - STM Monad in the Glasgow Haskell Compiler
  - STMX in Common Lisp
  - Refs in Clojure
  - gcc 4.7+ for C/C++
  - C++ Transactional Memory Technical Specification (experimental)
  - PyPy
  - Part of the picotm Transaction Framework for C
  - The TVar in concurrent-ruby, a concurrency library for Ruby
  - Verse

== See also ==
- Memory semantics
- Automatic mutual exclusion
