= SecPAL =

Declarative security policy language

SecPAL is a declarative, logic-based, security policy language that has been developed to support the complex access control requirements of large scale distributed computing environments.

== Common access control requirements ==
Here is a partial-list of some of the challenges that SecPAL addresses:

- How does an organization establish a fine-grained trust relationship with another organization across organizational boundaries?
- How does a user delegate a subset of a user’s rights (constrained delegation) to another user residing either in the same organization or in a different organization?
- How can access control policy be authored and reviewed in a manner that is human readable - allowing auditors and non-technical people to understand such policies?
- How does an organization support compliance regulations requiring that a system be able to demonstrate exactly why it was that a user was granted access to a resource?
- How can policies be authored, composed and evaluated in a manner that is efficient, deterministic and tractable?

== Architecture ==
The SecPAL Research homepage includes links to the following papers which describe the architecture of SecPAL at varying levels of abstraction.

- SecPAL Formal Model ("Design and Semantics of a Decentralized Authorization Language") – Formal description of the abstract types, language semantics and evaluation rules that support deterministic evaluation in efficient time.
- SecPAL Schema Specification – Specification describing a practical XML based implementation of the formal model targeted at supporting access control requirements of distributed applications
- .NET Research Implementation of SecPAL – C# implementation, C# samples for common authz patterns, and comprehensive developer documentation and a getting started tutorial

== Additional research ==
- IEEE Grid 2007 - Fine Grained Access Control Using SecPAL
- SecPAL for Privacy
