= Andy Gordon (footballer) =

Scottish footballer

Personal information
- Full name: Andrew Gordon
- Date of birth: 6 July 1944
- Place of birth: Bathgate, Scotland
- Position: Centre forward

Senior career*
Years	Team	Apps	(Gls)
–	West Auckland Town		
1969–1970	Darlington	3	(0)
–	West Auckland Town		
- * Club domestic league appearances and goals

Andrew Gordon (born 6 July 1944) is a Scottish former footballer who played as an amateur centre forward in the Football League for Darlington, between spells in non-league football with West Auckland Town.
