= Biconnected graph =

Type of graph

In graph theory, a biconnected graph is a connected and "nonseparable" graph, meaning that if any one vertex were to be removed, the graph will remain connected. Therefore a biconnected graph has no articulation vertices.

The property of being 2-connected is equivalent to biconnectivity, except that the complete graph of two vertices is usually not regarded as 2-connected.

This property is especially useful in maintaining a graph with a two-fold redundancy, to prevent disconnection upon the removal of a single edge (or connection).

The use of biconnected graphs is very important in the field of networking (see Network flow), because of this property of redundancy.

== Definition ==
A biconnected undirected graph is a connected graph that is not broken into disconnected pieces by deleting any single vertex (and its incident edges).

A biconnected directed graph is one such that for any two vertices v and w there are two directed paths from v to w which have no vertices in common other than v and w.

== Examples ==
A biconnected graph on four vertices and four edges

A graph that is not biconnected. The removal of vertex x would disconnect the graph.

A biconnected graph on five vertices and six edges

A graph that is not biconnected. The removal of vertex x would disconnect the graph.

Nonseparable (or 2-connected) graphs (or blocks) with n nodes (sequence A002218 in the OEIS)
Vertices	Number of Possibilities
1	0
2	1
3	1
4	3
5	10
6	56
7	468
8	7123
9	194066
10	9743542
11	900969091
12	153620333545
13	48432939150704
14	28361824488394169
15	30995890806033380784
16	63501635429109597504951
17	244852079292073376010411280
18	1783160594069429925952824734641
19	24603887051350945867492816663958981

== Structure of 2-connected graphs ==
Every 2-connected graph can be constructed inductively by adding paths to a cycle (Diestel 2016, p. 59).

== See also ==
- Biconnected component
