= Sequential algorithm =

Type of algorithm

In computer science, a sequential algorithm or serial algorithm is an algorithm that is executed sequentially – once through, from start to finish, without other processing executing – as opposed to concurrently or in parallel. The term is primarily used to contrast with concurrent algorithm or parallel algorithm; most standard computer algorithms are sequential algorithms, and not specifically identified as such, as sequentialness is a background assumption. Concurrency and parallelism are in general distinct concepts, but they often overlap – many distributed algorithms are both concurrent and parallel – and thus "sequential" is used to contrast with both, without distinguishing which one. If these need to be distinguished, the opposing pairs sequential/concurrent and serial/parallel may be used.

"Sequential algorithm" may also refer specifically to an algorithm for decoding a convolutional code.

== See also ==
- Online algorithm
- Streaming algorithm
