= Apache Hama =

Distributed computing framework

- Developer: Apache Software Foundation
- Preview release: 0.7.1 / March 14, 2016; 10 years ago
- Written in: Java
- Operating system: Cross-platform
- Type: Distributed computing, bulk synchronous parallel
- License: Apache License 2.0
- Website: hama.apache.org
- Repository: Hama Repository

Apache Hama is a distributed computing framework based on bulk synchronous parallel computing techniques for massive scientific computations e.g., matrix, graph and network algorithms. Originally a sub-project of Hadoop, it became an Apache Software Foundation top level project in 2012. It was created by Edward J. Yoon, who named it (short for "Hadoop Matrix Algebra"), and Hama also means hippopotamus in Yoon's native Korean language (하마), following the trend of naming Apache projects after animals and zoology (such as Apache Pig). Hama was inspired by Google's Pregel large-scale graph computing framework described in 2010. When executing graph algorithms, Hama showed a fifty-fold performance increase relative to Hadoop.

Retired in April 2020, project resources are made available as part of the Apache Attic. Yoon cited issues of installation, scalability, and a difficult programming model for its lack of adoption.

== Architecture ==
Hama consists of three major components: BSPMaster, GroomServers and Zookeeper.

=== BSPMaster ===
BSPMaster is responsible for:

- Maintaining groom server status
- Controlling super steps in a cluster
- Maintaining job progress information
- Scheduling jobs and assigning tasks to groom servers
- Disseminating execution class across groom servers
- Controlling fault
- Providing users with the cluster control interface.

A BSP Master and multiple grooms are started by the script. Then, the bsp master starts up with a RPC server for groom servers. Groom servers starts up with a BSPPeer instance and a RPC proxy to contact the bsp master. After started, each groom periodically sends a heartbeat message that encloses its groom server status, including maximum task capacity, unused memory, and so on.

Each time the BSP master receives a heartbeat message, it brings the groom server status up-to-date. The bsp master makes use of groom servers' status in order to assign tasks to idle groom servers - and returns a heartbeat response containing assigned tasks and others actions for a groom server to do. Currently BSP master has a FIFO job scheduler and simple task assignment algorithms.

=== GroomServer ===
A groom server (shortly referred to as groom) is a process that performs BSP tasks assigned by BSPMaster. Each groom contacts the BSPMaster, and it takes assigned tasks and reports its status by means of periodical piggybacks with BSPMaster. Each groom is designed to run with HDFS or other distributed storages. Basically, a groom server and a data node should be run on one physical node.

=== Zookeeper ===
A Zookeeper is used to manage the efficient barrier synchronisation of the BSPPeers.

== See also ==
- Bulk synchronous parallel
- Message Passing Interface
