= Apache Giraph =

Open-source graph processing software

- Developer: Apache Software Foundation
- Stable release: 1.3.0 / 11 June 2020; 5 years ago
- Repository: gitbox.apache.org/repos/asf/giraph.git
- Written in: Java
- Operating system: Cross-platform
- Type: Graph processing
- License: Apache License 2.0
- Website: giraph.apache.org

Apache Giraph is an Apache project to perform graph processing on big data. Giraph utilizes Apache Hadoop's MapReduce implementation to process graphs. Facebook used Giraph with some performance improvements to analyze one trillion edges using 200 machines in 4 minutes. Giraph is based on a paper published by Google about its own graph processing system called Pregel. It can be compared to other Big Graph processing libraries such as Cassovary.

As of September 2023, it is no longer actively developed.
