= National Register of Historic Places listings in Forsyth County, North Carolina =

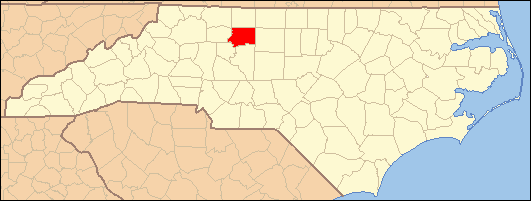

This list includes properties and districts listed on the National Register of Historic Places in Forsyth County, North Carolina. Click the "Map of all coordinates" link to the right to view an online map of all properties and districts with latitude and longitude coordinates in the table below.

== Current listings ==
This National Park Service list is complete through NPS recent listings posted May 22, 2026.

| | Name on the Register | Image | Date listed | Location | City or town | Description |
|---|---|---|---|---|---|---|
| 1 | Ardmore Historic District | Ardmore Historic District | August 25, 2004 (#04000904) | Roughly bounded by Knollwood, Queen, Duke, and Ardsley Sts. 36°05′03″N 80°16′29″W | Winston-Salem | |
| 2 | Arista Cotton Mill Complex | Arista Cotton Mill Complex | August 18, 1977 (#77000999) | 200 Brookstown Ave. 36°05′24″N 80°14′46″W | Winston-Salem | |
| 3 | Atkins High School (former) | Atkins High School (former) | December 30, 1999 (#99001618) | 1215 N. Cameron Ave. 36°06′37″N 80°13′20″W | Winston-Salem | |
| 4 | S. G. Atkins House | S. G. Atkins House | July 22, 1979 (#79001704) | 346 Atkins St. 36°05′32″N 80°13′45″W | Winston-Salem | |
| 5 | Agnew Hunter Bahnson House | Agnew Hunter Bahnson House | April 12, 2001 (#01000375) | Junction of W. 5th and Spring Sts. 36°05′55″N 80°15′12″W | Winston-Salem | |
| 6 | Bahnson Company Building | | May 21, 2026 (#100013058) | 1001 South Marshall Street; 36°04′57″N 80°14′35″W | Winston-Salem | |
| 7 | Bethabara Historic District | Bethabara Historic District | November 15, 1978 (#78001948) | North of Winston-Salem on NC 67; 36°09′16″N 80°17′55″W | Winston-Salem | |
| 8 | Bethabara Moravian Church | Bethabara Moravian Church | September 28, 1971 (#71000586) | 2147 Bethabara Rd. 36°09′12″N 80°18′01″W | Winston-Salem | |
| 9 | Bethania Historic District | Bethania Historic District | May 3, 1976 (#76001321) | North of Winston-Salem on NC 65, SR 1611, 1628, and 1688; also roughly the area outside the original district west and north along Muddy Creek, south to Reynolda Rd., and east along Walker Rd. 36°10′51″N 80°20′16″W | Bethania | Second set of boundaries represents a boundary increase of March 25, 1991 |
| 10 | George Black House and Brickyard | George Black House and Brickyard | January 28, 2000 (#99001683) | 111 Dellabrook Rd. 36°06′48″N 80°12′35″W | Winston-Salem | |
| 11 | William Allen Blair House | William Allen Blair House | April 25, 1985 (#85000876) | 210 S. Cherry St. 36°05′31″N 80°14′48″W | Winston-Salem | |
| 12 | Joseph Franklin Bland House | Joseph Franklin Bland House | August 21, 1984 (#84002265) | 1809 Virginia Rd. 36°06′20″N 80°16′13″W | Winston-Salem | |
| 13 | Brickenstein-Leinbach House | Brickenstein-Leinbach House | September 3, 1991 (#91001169) | 426 Old Salem Rd. 36°05′25″N 80°14′40″W | Winston-Salem | |
| 14 | W.C. Brown Apartment Building | W.C. Brown Apartment Building | June 26, 1998 (#98000725) | 311-317 E. 7th St. 36°06′09″N 80°14′28″W | Winston-Salem | |
| 15 | Camel City Coach Company - Atlantic/Southern Greyhound Lines Garage | | May 26, 2026 (#100013056) | 1007 South Marshall Street; 36°04′56″N 80°14′34″W | Winston-Salem | |
| 16 | Centerville Historic District | Centerville Historic District | May 8, 2008 (#08000379) | Roughly bounded by Waughtown, Vargrave, Haled, and Chapel Sts. 36°04′23″N 80°13′58″W | Winston-Salem | |
| 17 | Chatham Manufacturing Company-Western Electric Company | Chatham Manufacturing Company-Western Electric Company | August 4, 2011 (#11000509) | 750 and 800 Chatham Rd. 36°06′18″N 80°15′18″W | Winston-Salem | |
| 18 | Thurmond and Lucy Chatham House | Thurmond and Lucy Chatham House | August 18, 2014 (#14000493) | 112 N. Stratford St. 36°05′52″N 80°16′37″W | Winston-Salem | |
| 19 | Clayton Family Farm | Clayton Family Farm | October 5, 2001 (#01001072) | 5809 Stanley Dr. 36°12′03″N 80°16′19″W | Stanleyville | |
| 20 | Coan-Gray House | | August 7, 2023 (#100009227) | 1121 Arbor Rd. 36°07′06″N 80°16′24″W | Winston-Salem | |
| 21 | Conrad-Starbuck House | Conrad-Starbuck House | June 4, 1990 (#90000792) | 118 S. Cherry St. 36°05′36″N 80°14′50″W | Winston-Salem | |
| 22 | Craver Apartment Building | Craver Apartment Building | June 26, 1998 (#98000726) | 706-712 Chestnut St. 36°06′10″N 80°14′33″W | Winston-Salem | |
| 23 | Thomas A. Crews House | | April 26, 1993 (#93000316) | 4997 Main St. 36°10′30″N 80°09′06″W | Walkertown | |
| 24 | Downtown North Historic District | Downtown North Historic District | December 31, 2002 (#02001669) | Roughly bounded by W. 5th, W. 8th, N. Main, and N. Cherry Sts. 36°06′06″N 80°14′45″W | Winston-Salem | |
| 25 | Downtown Winston-Salem Historic District | | December 19, 2022 (#100008467) | 3rd, 4th, 5th, 6th, Spring, Spruce, Marshall, Cherry, Town Run, Trade, Liberty, and Church Sts. 36°05′53″N 80°14′56″W | Winston-Salem | |
| 26 | James B. and Diana M. Dyer House | James B. and Diana M. Dyer House | April 5, 2006 (#06000227) | 1015 W. Kent Rd. 36°06′56″N 80°16′25″W | Winston-Salem | |
| 27 | Evergreen Farm | | December 19, 2019 (#100004796) | 1532 Jonestown Rd. 36°02′33″N 80°20′53″W | Winston-Salem | |
| 28 | First Baptist Church | First Baptist Church | February 25, 1988 (#88000130) | 126 N. Main St. 36°07′13″N 80°04′21″W | Kernersville | |
| 29 | Flynt House | Flynt House | May 31, 2018 (#100002516) | 6780 University Parkway; 36°13′03″N 80°17′07″W | Rural Hall | |
| 30 | Forsyth County Courthouse | Forsyth County Courthouse | April 23, 2013 (#13000205) | 11 W. 3rd St. 36°05′53″N 80°14′40″W | Winston-Salem | |
| 31 | Gilmer Building | Gilmer Building | July 29, 1982 (#82003452) | 416-424 W. 4th St. 36°05′52″N 80°14′55″W | Winston-Salem | |
| 32 | Goler Memorial African Methodist Episcopal Zion Church | Goler Memorial African Methodist Episcopal Zion Church | June 26, 1998 (#98000727) | 630 Patterson Ave. 36°06′08″N 80°14′30″W | Winston-Salem | |
| 33 | Goler Metropolitan AME Zion Church | Goler Metropolitan AME Zion Church | January 27, 1999 (#99000060) | 1435 E. 4th St. 36°05′58″N 80°13′39″W | Winston-Salem | |
| 34 | Elizabeth and Bowman Gray Jr. House | | August 24, 2021 (#100006853) | 5909 Brookberry Farm Rd. 36°06′22″N 80°22′43″W | Lewisville | |
| 35 | Graylyn | Graylyn | August 3, 1978 (#78001949) | Reynolda Rd. 36°07′02″N 80°16′59″W | Winston-Salem | |
| 36 | P.H. Hanes Knitting Company | P.H. Hanes Knitting Company | June 10, 2005 (#05000548) | 675 N. Main St., 101 W. 6th St., and 600 N. Chestnut St. 36°06′06″N 80°14′39″W | Winston-Salem | |
| 37 | Hanes Hosiery Mill-Ivy Avenue Plant | Hanes Hosiery Mill-Ivy Avenue Plant | May 31, 2016 (#16000309) | 1245 and 1325 Ivy Ave. 36°06′40″N 80°14′18″W | Winston-Salem | |
| 38 | Alexander S. and Mary R. Hanes House | | April 18, 2023 (#100008851) | 525 North Hawthorne Rd. 36°06′20″N 80°16′04″W | Winston-Salem | |
| 39 | Robert M. Hanes House | Robert M. Hanes House | August 28, 2012 (#12000573) | 140 N. Stratford Rd. 36°05′54″N 80°16′38″W | Winston-Salem | |
| 40 | Harmon-Reid Mill | | February 25, 2022 (#88000132) | 208 Bodenhamer St. 36°07′15″N 80°04′10″W | Kernersville | |
| 41 | J. S. Hill House | J. S. Hill House | July 22, 1979 (#79001705) | 914 Stadium Dr. 36°05′24″N 80°13′41″W | Winston-Salem | Destroyed |
| 42 | Philip and Johanna Hoehns (Hanes) House | Philip and Johanna Hoehns (Hanes) House | April 19, 2016 (#16000186) | 3550 Middlebrook Dr. 36°00′11″N 80°22′59″W | Clemmons | |
| 43 | Holly Avenue Historic District | Holly Avenue Historic District | May 2, 2002 (#02000442) | Roughly bounded by Broad and Marshall Sts., Holly Ave., and Business I-40; 36°05′47″N 80°15′03″W | Winston-Salem | |
| 44 | Hoots Milling Company Roller Mill | Hoots Milling Company Roller Mill | May 19, 2014 (#14000227) | 1151 Canal Dr. 36°06′13″N 80°15′32″W | Winston-Salem | |
| 45 | Hylehurst | Hylehurst | July 21, 1983 (#83001878) | 224 S. Cherry St. 36°05′32″N 80°14′48″W | Winston-Salem | |
| 46 | Indera Mills | Indera Mills | July 15, 1999 (#99000843) | 400 S. Marshall St. 36°05′22″N 80°14′50″W | Winston-Salem | |
| 47 | Dr. Beverly Jones House | | January 20, 1978 (#78001947) | SR 1611; 36°11′36″N 80°20′12″W | Bethania | |
| 48 | John Henry Kapp Farm | John Henry Kapp Farm | August 31, 1992 (#92001087) | Northern side of NC 65, 0.1 miles (0.16 km) east of the junction with NC 67 (4647 Bethania-Tobaccoville Rd.); 36°10′59″N 80°21′33″W | Bethania | |
| 49 | Kernersville Depot | Kernersville Depot | February 25, 1988 (#88000133) | 121 Railroad St. 36°07′19″N 80°04′15″W | Kernersville | |
| 50 | Korner's Folly | Korner's Folly | March 20, 1973 (#73001340) | 413 S. Main St. 36°06′55″N 80°04′44″W | Kernersville | |
| 51 | Lloyd Presbyterian Church | Lloyd Presbyterian Church | June 26, 1998 (#98000728) | 748 Chestnut St. 36°06′13″N 80°14′33″W | Winston-Salem | |
| 52 | Cicero Francis Lowe House | Cicero Francis Lowe House | December 20, 1984 (#84000535) | 204 Cascade Ave. 36°04′23″N 80°14′36″W | Winston-Salem | |
| 53 | Col. Jacob Lott Ludlow House | Col. Jacob Lott Ludlow House | March 17, 1983 (#83001879) | 434 Summit St. 36°05′53″N 80°15′26″W | Winston-Salem | |
| 54 | Mars Hill Baptist Church | Mars Hill Baptist Church | January 27, 1999 (#99000061) | 1331 E. 4th St. 36°05′58″N 80°13′46″W | Winston-Salem | |
| 55 | Isaac Harrison McKaughan House | Isaac Harrison McKaughan House | February 11, 1988 (#88000127) | 510 Salisbury St. 36°06′49″N 80°04′40″W | Kernersville | |
| 56 | Memorial Industrial School | | August 13, 2015 (#15000529) | 100 Horizons Ln. 36°13′36″N 80°13′42″W | Rural Hall | |
| 57 | Middleton House | | December 28, 2000 (#00001552) | 2721 Robinhood Rd. 36°07′03″N 80°17′32″W | Winston-Salem | |
| 58 | Nissen Building | Nissen Building | March 17, 1983 (#83001880) | 310 W. 4th St.; also 314 W. 4th St. 36°05′31″N 80°15′14″W | Winston-Salem | 314 W. 4th represents a boundary increase of August 25, 2004 |
| 59 | S. J. Nissen Building | S. J. Nissen Building | August 16, 2007 (#07000820) | 310 E. 3rd St. 36°05′52″N 80°14′26″W | Winston-Salem | |
| 60 | North Cherry Street Historic District | | February 25, 1988 (#88000118) | 1407-15, 1419, 1463, and 2067 N. Cherry St. 36°07′15″N 80°04′27″W | Kernersville | |
| 61 | North Cherry Street Historic District | North Cherry Street Historic District | December 23, 2004 (#04001394) | N. Cherry St. bounded by 14th, 23rd, and 17th Sts., and Lincoln and Pittsburg Aves. 36°06′56″N 80°15′19″W | Winston-Salem | Boundary decrease June 20, 2014 |
| 62 | O'Hanlon Building | O'Hanlon Building | July 12, 1984 (#84002269) | 103 W. 4th St. 36°05′54″N 80°14′44″W | Winston-Salem | |
| 63 | Oak Crest Historic District | Oak Crest Historic District | December 20, 2016 (#16000877) | 1141-1537 Polo and Fred's Rds., Friendship, Crepe Myrtle, and Rosedale Circles, Idlewilde Dr., Harmon Ave., and Hobart St. 36°08′17″N 80°17′10″W | Winston-Salem | |
| 64 | Oak Grove School | Oak Grove School | December 31, 2002 (#02001668) | Oak Grove Circle, 0.3 miles (0.48 km) east of the junction with Bethabara Rd. 36°10′20″N 80°19′16″W | Winston-Salem | |
| 65 | Old German Baptist Brethern Church | | December 1, 2014 (#14000984) | 4916 Charnel Rd. 36°00′40″N 80°20′30″W | Winston-Salem | |
| 66 | Old Richmond Schoolhouse and Gymnasium | Old Richmond Schoolhouse and Gymnasium | January 21, 2009 (#08001362) | 6315 and 6375 Tobaccoville Rd. 36°12′22″N 80°23′23″W | Tobaccoville | |
| 67 | Old Salem Historic District | Old Salem Historic District | November 13, 1966 (#66000591) | Salem College campus and area near Salem Sq. 36°05′15″N 80°14′32″W | Winston-Salem | |
| 68 | J. W. Paisley House | | July 22, 1979 (#79001706) | 934 Stadium Dr. 36°05′24″N 80°13′38″W | Winston-Salem | |
| 69 | Pepper Building | Pepper Building | October 20, 2014 (#12000263) | 100-106 W. 4th St. 36°05′53″N 80°14′42″W | Winston-Salem | |
| 70 | H.D. Poindexter Houses | H.D. Poindexter Houses | July 31, 1978 (#78001950) | 124 and 130 West End Boulevard; 36°06′04″N 80°15′10″W | Winston-Salem | |
| 71 | Reynolda Historic District | Reynolda Historic District | November 28, 1980 (#80002833) | Reynolda Rd. 36°07′37″N 80°16′52″W | Winston-Salem | May include Reynolda House Museum of American Art |
| 72 | Reynolds Building | Reynolds Building | August 19, 2014 (#14000494) | 41 E. 4th St. 36°05′56″N 80°14′40″W | Winston-Salem | |
| 73 | Richard J. Reynolds High School and Richard J. Reynolds Memorial Auditorium | Richard J. Reynolds High School and Richard J. Reynolds Memorial Auditorium | January 11, 1991 (#90002139) | 301 Hawthorne Rd. 36°06′05″N 80°15′48″W | Winston-Salem | |
| 74 | R.J. Reynolds Tobacco Company Buildings 2-1 and 2-2 | | October 26, 2017 (#100001631) | 951 Reynolds Boulevard; 36°08′11″N 80°15′07″W | Winston-Salem | |
| 75 | R. J. Reynolds Tobacco Company Buildings 82 and 83 | | August 7, 2024 (#100010664) | 821 East Twenty-Fifth Street; 36°07′20″N 80°14′03″W | Winston-Salem | |
| 76 | Reynoldstown Historic District | Reynoldstown Historic District | February 28, 2008 (#08000111) | Portions of the 800 and 900 blocks of Camel, Cameron, Graham, Jackson, and Rich Aves., E. 10th St., and the Cameron Avenue Bridge; 36°06′18″N 80°13′22″W | Winston-Salem | |
| 77 | Richmond Courthouse Site | | January 5, 1984 (#84002273) | Address Restricted | Donnaha | |
| 78 | Roberts-Justice House | Roberts-Justice House | February 25, 1988 (#88000129) | 133 N. Main St. 36°07′13″N 80°04′23″W | Kernersville | |
| 79 | A. Robinson Building | A. Robinson Building | June 26, 1998 (#98000729) | 707-709 Patterson Ave. 36°10′11″N 80°14′28″W | Winston-Salem | |
| 80 | James Mitchell Rogers House | James Mitchell Rogers House | July 15, 1982 (#82003453) | 102 S. Cherry St. 36°05′38″N 80°14′50″W | Winston-Salem | |
| 81 | Rural Hall Depot | Rural Hall Depot | July 21, 1983 (#83001881) | Depot St. (SR 1646); 36°14′36″N 80°17′51″W | Rural Hall | |
| 82 | St. Paul's Episcopal Church | St. Paul's Episcopal Church | November 5, 2020 (#100005747) | 520 Summit St. 36°05′57″N 80°15′26″W | Winston-Salem | |
| 83 | St. Philip's Moravian Church | St. Philip's Moravian Church | September 3, 1991 (#91001170) | Eastern side of S. Church St. near Race St. in Old Salem; 36°05′04″N 80°14′27″W | Winston-Salem | |
| 84 | Salem Tavern | Salem Tavern | October 15, 1966 (#66000592) | 800 S. Main St. 36°05′07″N 80°14′31″W | Winston-Salem | |
| 85 | Salem Town Hall | Salem Town Hall | March 17, 1983 (#83001882) | 301 S. Liberty St. 36°05′31″N 80°14′37″W | Winston-Salem | |
| 86 | John Jacob Schaub House | | October 7, 1982 (#82001296) | Northeast of Vienna off SR 1455; 36°10′04″N 80°22′50″W | Pfafftown | |
| 87 | Shamrock Mills | Shamrock Mills | May 23, 1978 (#78001951) | 3rd and Marshall Sts. 36°05′45″N 80°14′55″W | Winston-Salem | |
| 88 | Shell Service Station | Shell Service Station | May 13, 1976 (#76001322) | Sprague and Peachtree Sts., NW. 36°04′04″N 80°12′51″W | Winston-Salem | |
| 89 | Christian Thomas Shultz House | Christian Thomas Shultz House | December 16, 2005 (#05001413) | 3960 Walnut Hills Dr. 36°08′31″N 80°20′39″W | Winston-Salem | |
| 90 | Single Brothers Industrial Complex Site | Single Brothers Industrial Complex Site | December 13, 1979 (#79001707) | Address Restricted | Winston-Salem | |
| 91 | Single Brothers' House | Single Brothers' House | April 15, 1970 (#70000454) | S. Main and Academy Sts. 36°05′14″N 80°14′33″W | Winston-Salem | |
| 92 | W.F. Smith and Sons Leaf House and Brown Brothers Company Building | W.F. Smith and Sons Leaf House and Brown Brothers Company Building | February 23, 1978 (#78001952) | 4th St. between Patterson and Linden; 36°05′56″N 80°14′24″W | Winston-Salem | |
| 93 | John Wesley Snyder House | John Wesley Snyder House | October 12, 2000 (#00001209) | 2715 Old Salisbury Rd. 36°01′30″N 80°16′27″W | Winston-Salem | |
| 94 | Sosnik-Morris-Early Commercial Block | Sosnik-Morris-Early Commercial Block | April 5, 1984 (#84002293) | 500 W. 4th St. 36°05′52″N 80°14′56″W | Winston-Salem | |
| 95 | South Main Street Historic District | South Main Street Historic District | February 25, 1988 (#88000137) | 100-600 blocks of S. Main St. 36°06′55″N 80°04′42″W | Kernersville | |
| 96 | South Trade Street Houses | South Trade Street Houses | December 11, 1978 (#78001953) | 434, 440, and 448 S. Trade St. 36°05′20″N 80°14′45″W | Winston-Salem | |
| 97 | William Henry and Sarah Hauser Speas House | | September 11, 2018 (#100002927) | 3991 River Ridge Rd. 36°09′50″N 80°25′35″W | Pfafftown | |
| 98 | Spruce Street YMCA | Spruce Street YMCA | July 12, 1984 (#84002296) | 315 N. Spruce St. 36°05′50″N 80°14′55″W | Winston-Salem | |
| 99 | Samuel B. Stauber Farm | | January 12, 1988 (#87002232) | SR 1611; 36°11′58″N 80°20′57″W | Bethania | |
| 100 | Stuart Motor Company | Stuart Motor Company | February 25, 1988 (#88000139) | 109-111 E. Mountain St. 36°07′11″N 80°04′22″W | Kernersville | |
| 101 | Sunnyside-Central Terrace Historic District | Sunnyside-Central Terrace Historic District | May 8, 2008 (#08000380) | Roughly bounded by Haled, Junia, Monmouth, Glendale, Goldfloss, Brookline, and Main Sts. 36°04′12″N 80°14′03″W | Winston-Salem | |
| 102 | Union Station | Union Station | December 24, 1998 (#98001547) | 300 Martin Luther King, Jr., Dr. 36°05′36″N 80°13′42″W | Winston-Salem | |
| 103 | Wachovia Bank and Trust Company Building | Wachovia Bank and Trust Company Building | May 31, 1984 (#84002306) | 8 W. 3rd St. 36°05′50″N 80°14′39″W | Winston-Salem | |
| 104 | Wachovia Building | Wachovia Building | April 19, 2001 (#01000376) | 301 N. Main St. 36°05′53″N 80°14′37″W | Winston-Salem | |
| 105 | Waller House | Waller House | August 25, 2014 (#14000519) | 9186 Reynolda Rd. 36°12′20″N 80°24′57″W | Pfafftown | |
| 106 | Washington Park Historic District | Washington Park Historic District | January 13, 1992 (#91001960) | Roughly bounded by Leonard St., Acadia Ave., Sunnyside Ave., Vintage Ave., Broad St., Bond St., and Washington Park; 36°04′24″N 80°14′41″W | Winston-Salem | |
| 107 | Waughtown-Belview Historic District | Waughtown-Belview Historic District | January 20, 2005 (#04001521) | Roughly bounded by Dacian, Waughtown St., Bellauwood, Sprague, Ernest, Goldfloss, and Gilbreath Dr. 36°04′02″N 80°12′47″W | Winston-Salem | |
| 108 | West End Historic District | West End Historic District | December 4, 1986 (#86003442) | Roughly bounded by West End Boulevard, 6th, Broad, and 4th Sts., Interstate 40, Sunset Dr., and Peters Creek; 36°05′48″N 80°15′32″W | Winston-Salem | |
| 109 | West Salem Historic District | West Salem Historic District | January 19, 2005 (#04001524) | Roughly bounded by Business 40, Poplar, Salem Ave., Walnut, Shober, and Hutton Sts., Granville Dr., and Beaumont St. 36°05′12″N 80°14′58″W | Winston-Salem | |
| 110 | Winston Lake Golf Course | | December 12, 2023 (#100009618) | 3535 Winston Lake Road, 2790 New Walkertown Road; 36°07′08″N 80°12′04″W | Winston-Salem | |
| 111 | Winston-Salem City Hall | Winston-Salem City Hall | October 20, 2001 (#01001130) | 101 S. Main St. 36°05′42″N 80°14′36″W | Winston-Salem | |
| 112 | Winston-Salem Southbound Railway Freight Warehouse and Office | Winston-Salem Southbound Railway Freight Warehouse and Office | November 29, 1991 (#91001747) | 300 S. Liberty St. 36°05′31″N 80°14′38″W | Winston-Salem | |
| 113 | Winston-Salem Tobacco Historic District | Winston-Salem Tobacco Historic District | August 5, 2009 (#09000602) | Bounded by Chestnut St. on the west, 5th and 7th Sts. on the north, Linden St. on the east, and 4th and Fogle Sts. on the south 36°06′02″N 80°14′24″W | Winston-Salem | |
| 114 | Bunyan S. and Edith W. Womble House | | August 28, 2019 (#100004325) | 200 North Stratford Rd. 36°05′57″N 80°16′35″W | Winston-Salem | |
| 115 | Zevely House | Zevely House | April 24, 1973 (#73001341) | 901 W. 4th St. 36°05′49″N 80°15′26″W | Winston-Salem | Moved to its present location from 734 Oak St. in 1974. |

== See also ==
- National Register of Historic Places listings in North Carolina
- List of National Historic Landmarks in North Carolina
