= Brown Apartments =

Brown Apartments may refer to:

- Brown Apartments (Cedar Rapids, Iowa), listed on the NRHP in Cedar Rapids, Iowa
- Brown Apartments (Portland, Oregon), listed on the NRHP in Portland, Oregon
- W.C. Brown Apartment Building, Winston-Salem, North Carolina, listed on the National Register of Historic Places listings in Forsyth County, North Carolina
