= Reynoldstown Historic District =

Reynoldstown Historic District may refer to:

- Reynoldstown Historic District (Atlanta, Georgia), listed on the NRHP in Georgia
- Reynoldstown Historic District (Winston-Salem, North Carolina), listed on the NRHP in North Carolina
