= A. Robinson Building =

Historic commercial building in North Carolina, US

- U.S. National Register of Historic Places
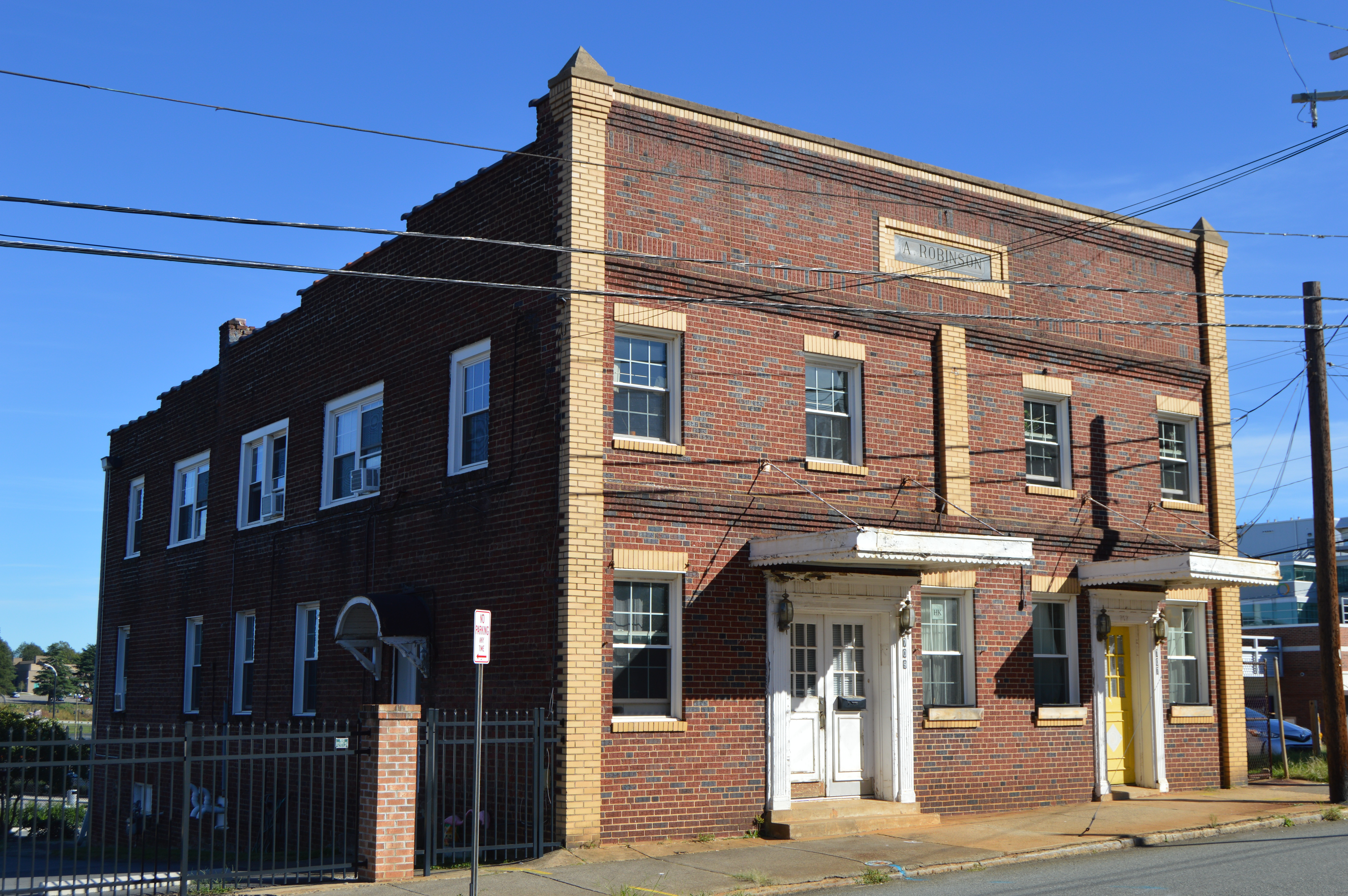
- Front and northern side

- Location within North Carolina Location within the United States
- Location: 707-709 Patterson Ave., Winston-Salem, North Carolina
- Coordinates: 36°6′10″N 80°14′28″W
- Area: less than one acre
- Built: 1940
- Built by: Robinson, Aladine; Greenwood, J.W., et al.
- Architectural style: Early Commercial
- MPS: African-American Neighborhoods in Northeastern Winston-Salem MPS
- NRHP reference No.: 98000729
- Added to NRHP: June 26, 1998

A. Robinson Building, also known as Howard-Robinson Building and Pyramid Barber Shop, is a historic commercial building located at Winston-Salem, Forsyth County, North Carolina. It was built in 1940–1941, and is a two-story, yellow and red brick commercial building. The north and south facades are of brick made by well-known and celebrated local brickmaker George S. Black. The building was constructed to house African-American businesses including the Howard-Robinson Funeral Home and a barber shop.

It was listed on the National Register of Historic Places in 1998.
