= Bethania Historic District =

Historic district in North Carolina, US

- U.S. National Register of Historic Places
- U.S. National Historic Landmark District
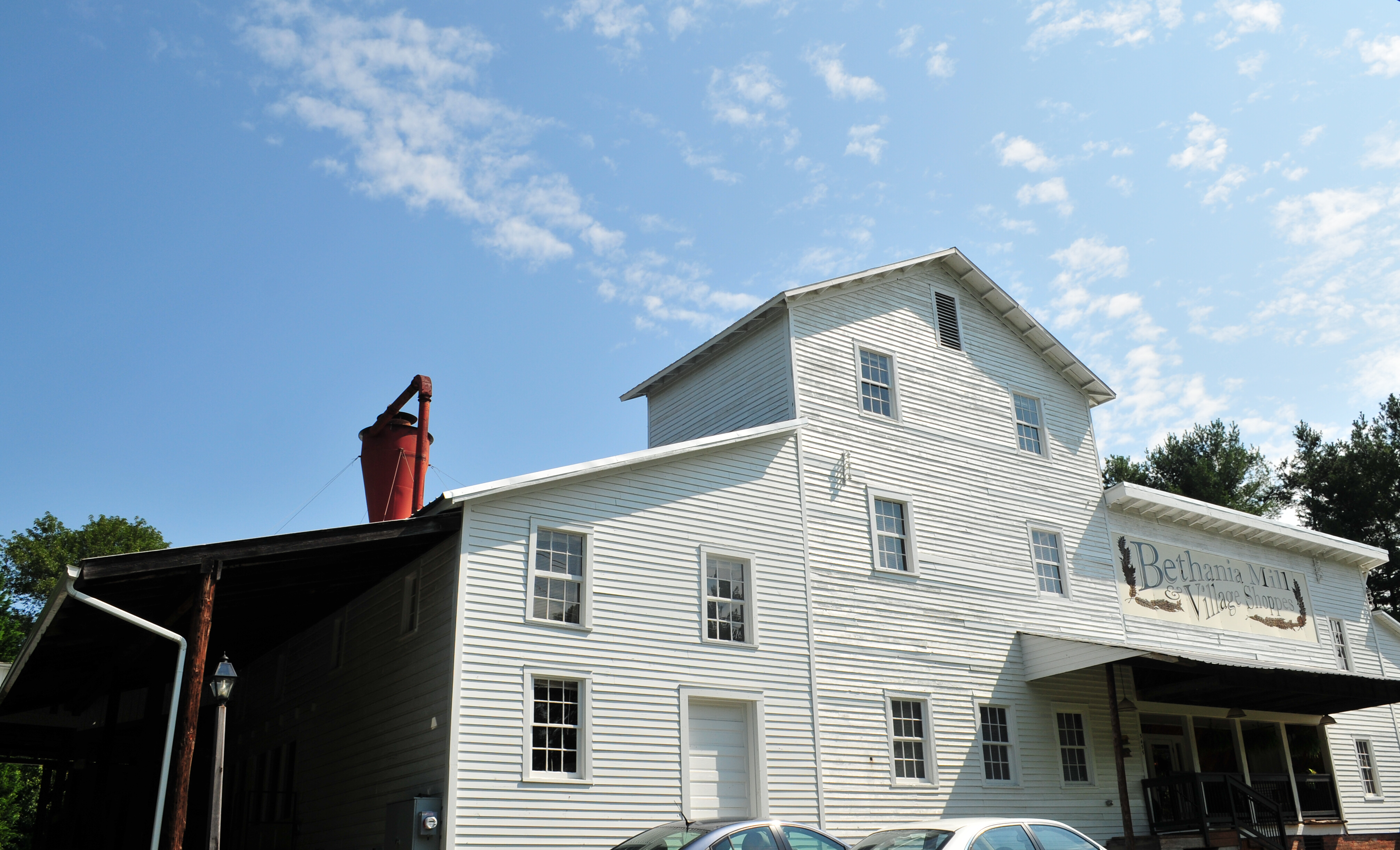
- Bethania Mill

- Location within North Carolina Location within the United States
- Location: Bethania, North Carolina
- Coordinates: 36°11′2″N 80°20′13″W
- Area: 500 acres (2.0 km^{2})
- Built: 1759 (original); 1750 (increase)
- Architectural style: Bungalow/craftsman
- NRHP reference No.: 76001321 (original); 91000346 (increase)

Significant dates
- Added to NRHP: May 03, 1976
- Boundary increase: March 25, 1991
- Designated NHLD: August 7, 2001

The Bethania Historic District encompasses the historic planned center of the town of Bethania, North Carolina. A National Historic Landmark District, it is a rare example of a Moravian linear agricultural village in the United States, planned and founded in 1759. Land use and road patterns of the original plan are still discernible in the community. It was declared a National Historic Landmark in 2001, and is at 500 acres (2.0 km^{2}) the largest historic district in Forsyth County.

== Description and history ==
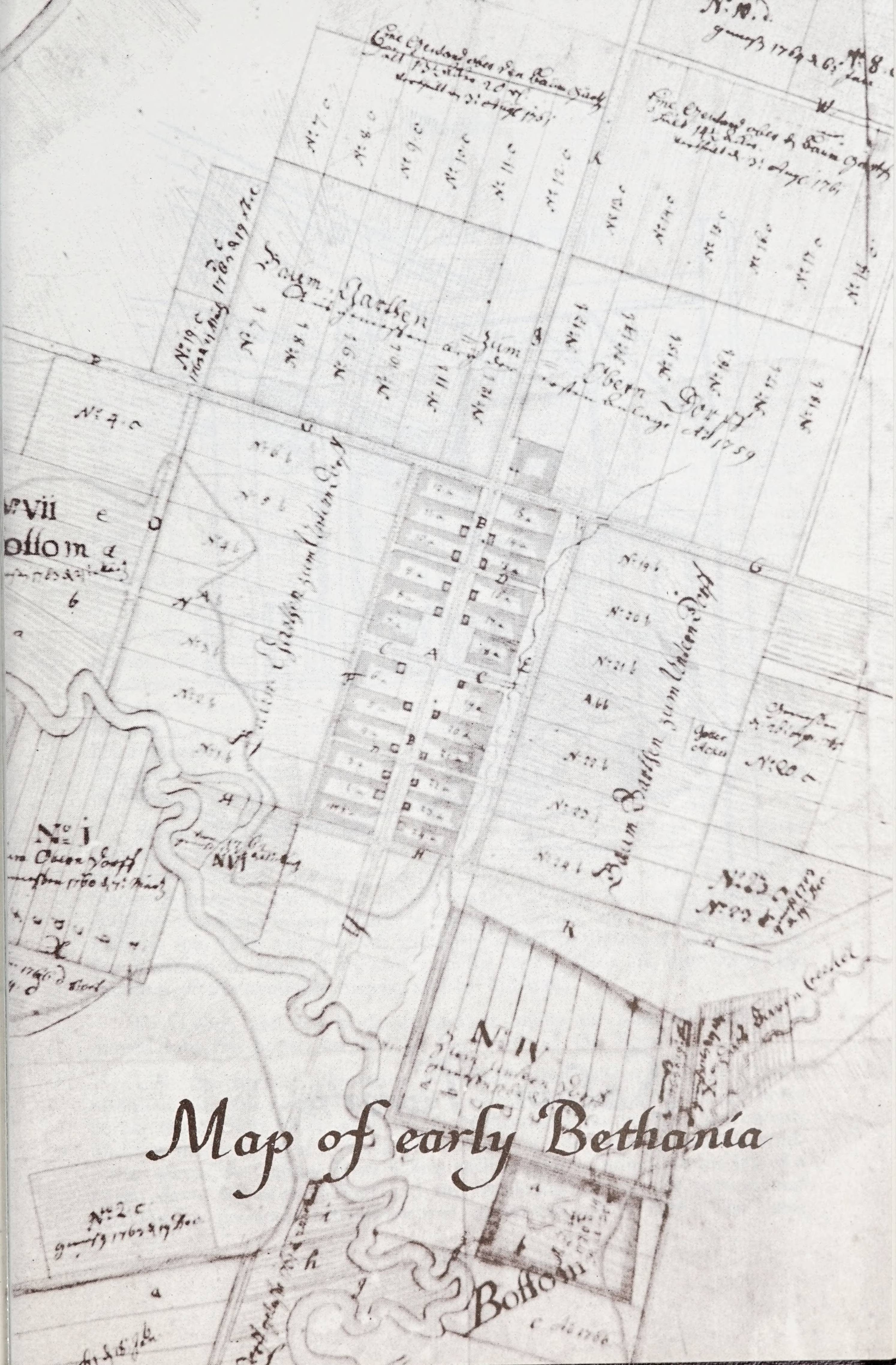
Map of early Bethania.

Bethania is located on the outskirts of Winston-Salem, North Carolina, in the northwestern part of Forsyth County. The area that is now Forsyth County was sold to members of the Moravian Church, who called the area Wachovia. In 1753 they established a temporary community at Bethabara, with the intent of establishing permanent settlements elsewhere on the tract. Planned by Christian Philip Gottlieb Reuter, Bethania was the first permanent settlement laid out and established in 1759 on 2,000 acres (8.1 km^{2}) of the nearly 100,000 acres (400 km^{2}) Wachovia tract. Reuter's plan called for a compact village settlement near Muddy Creek, with agricultural areas near the creek and in the uplands above the village. The settlement had four defined areas, each of which was divided into 24 parcels: Residential Lots, Orchard Lots, Bottom Lots, and Upland Lots, reflecting their locations and intended uses. A network of roads was laid out to provide access to these parcels. This basic plan was enlarged as the threat of Native American attack subsided, with new lots allocated into the 19th century. The original road layout and usage of a significant portion of the original layout of the community is still visible in Bethania today. The principal through roads and access roads are Main Street, Bethania Road, Bethania-Rural Hall Road, and Loesch's Lane, with the village center further served by Town Lot Drive. Many of the agricultural lots continue to see agricultural use, although some have been developed into residential subdivisions. Some of the buildings lining Main Street date to the 1760s and 1770s, representing the early development of the town.

Historic Bethania operates a visitor center, and provides a map for self-guided walking tours of the town.

== See also ==
- List of National Historic Landmarks in North Carolina
- National Register of Historic Places listings in Forsyth County, North Carolina
