= Christian Thomas Shultz House =

Historic house in North Carolina, United States

- U.S. National Register of Historic Places
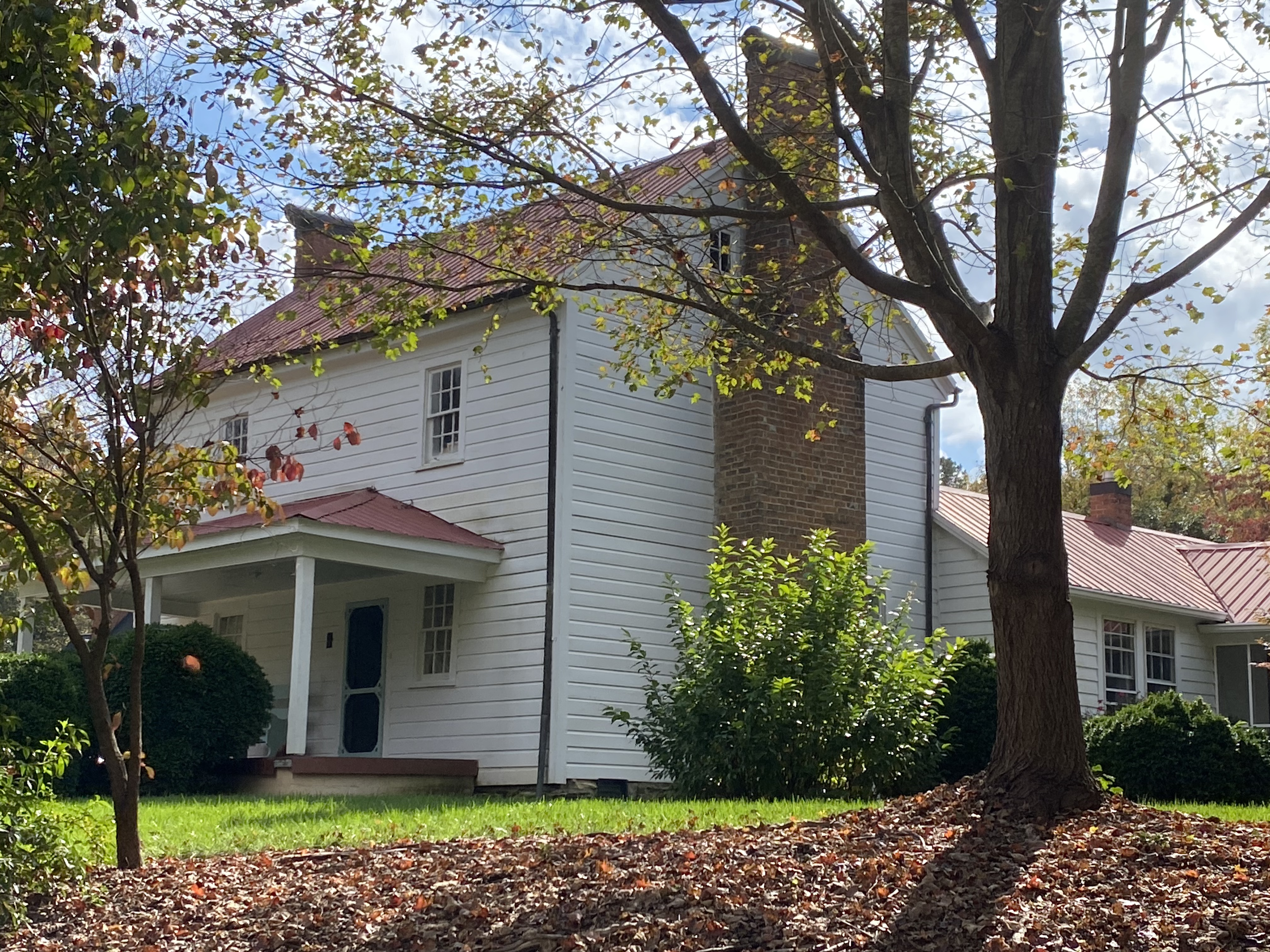

- Location within North Carolina Location within the United States
- Location: 3960 Walnut Hills Dr., near Winston-Salem, North Carolina
- Coordinates: 36°8′31″N 80°20′39″W
- Area: 1.3 acres (0.53 ha)
- Built: 1830
- Architectural style: Hall-and-parlor log house
- NRHP reference No.: 05001413
- Added to NRHP: December 16, 2005

Christian Thomas Shultz House is a historic home located near Winston-Salem, Forsyth County, North Carolina. It was built about 1830, and is a two-story, log dwelling with a hall and parlor plan with a pair of exterior gable-end chimneys. It is sheathed in German siding. A one-story frame rear ell was added about 1945. Also on the property is a contributing log smokehouse, dated to the late-1860s.

It was listed on the National Register of Historic Places in 2005.
