= Oak Grove School (Winston-Salem, North Carolina) =

Historic schoolhouse

- YWCA Oak Grove School
- U.S. National Register of Historic Places
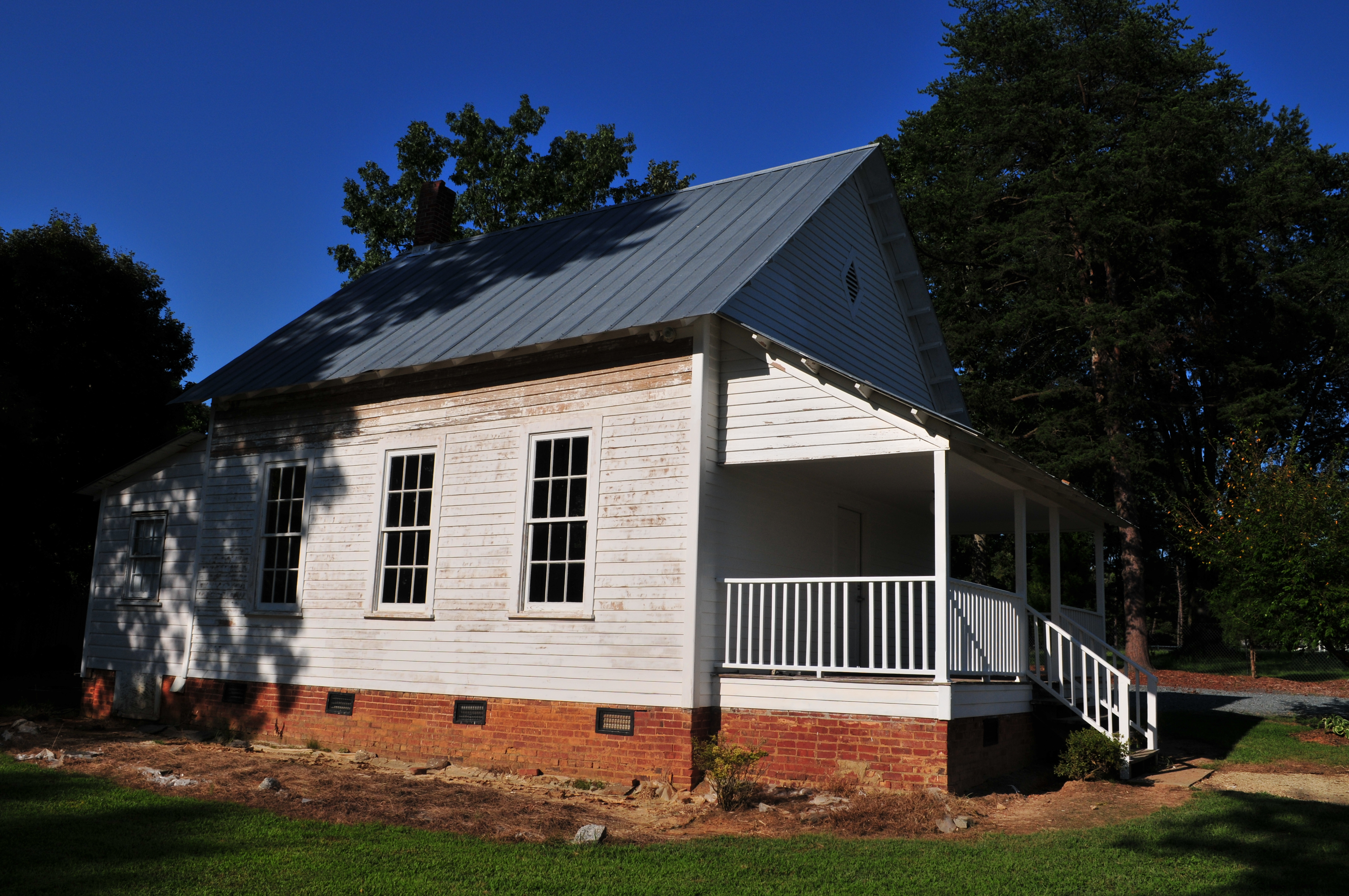
- Oak Grove School, September 2013

- Location within North Carolina Location within the United States
- Location: Oak Grove Circle, 0.3 mi. E of jct. with Bethabara Rd., Winston-Salem, North Carolina
- Coordinates: 36°10′20″N 80°19′16″W
- Area: 0.5 acres (0.20 ha)
- Built: c. 1910
- NRHP reference No.: 02001668
- Added to NRHP: December 31, 2002

Oak Grove School is a historic one-room school for African-American students located at Winston-Salem and owned by the YWCA of Winston Salem, Forsyth County, North Carolina. It was built about 1910, and is a one-story, gable-front, in weatherboard clad building with a full-width, shed roof porch. The school closed about 1950, and was used as a store. It was restored in 1998.

It was listed on the National Register of Historic Places in 2002.
