= Old German Baptist Brethren Church (Winston-Salem) =

Historic church in North Carolina, United States

- Old German Baptist Brethern Church
- U.S. National Register of Historic Places
- Location within North Carolina Location within the United States
- Location: 4916 Charnel Rd., near Winston-Salem, North Carolina
- Coordinates: 36°00′40″N 80°20′30″W
- Area: 0.3 acres (0.12 ha)
- Built: 1860, 1942, 1950
- Built by: Ellis, Alexander Hampton; Beckner family
- Architectural style: Meetinghouse
- NRHP reference No.: 14000984
- Added to NRHP: December 1, 2014

The Old German Baptist Brethren Church, also known as Fraternity Church, Old Order Church, and Old Fraternity Church, is a historic German Baptist Brethren church located near Winston-Salem, Forsyth County, North Carolina. The original section was built in 1860, and is a one-story, front-gable-roofed, heavy-timber-frame meetinghouse. Two frame additions were added to the rear in 1942 and in 1950.

It was listed on the National Register of Historic Places in 2014.
