= Gilmer Building =

Historic commercial building in North Carolina, US

- U.S. National Register of Historic Places
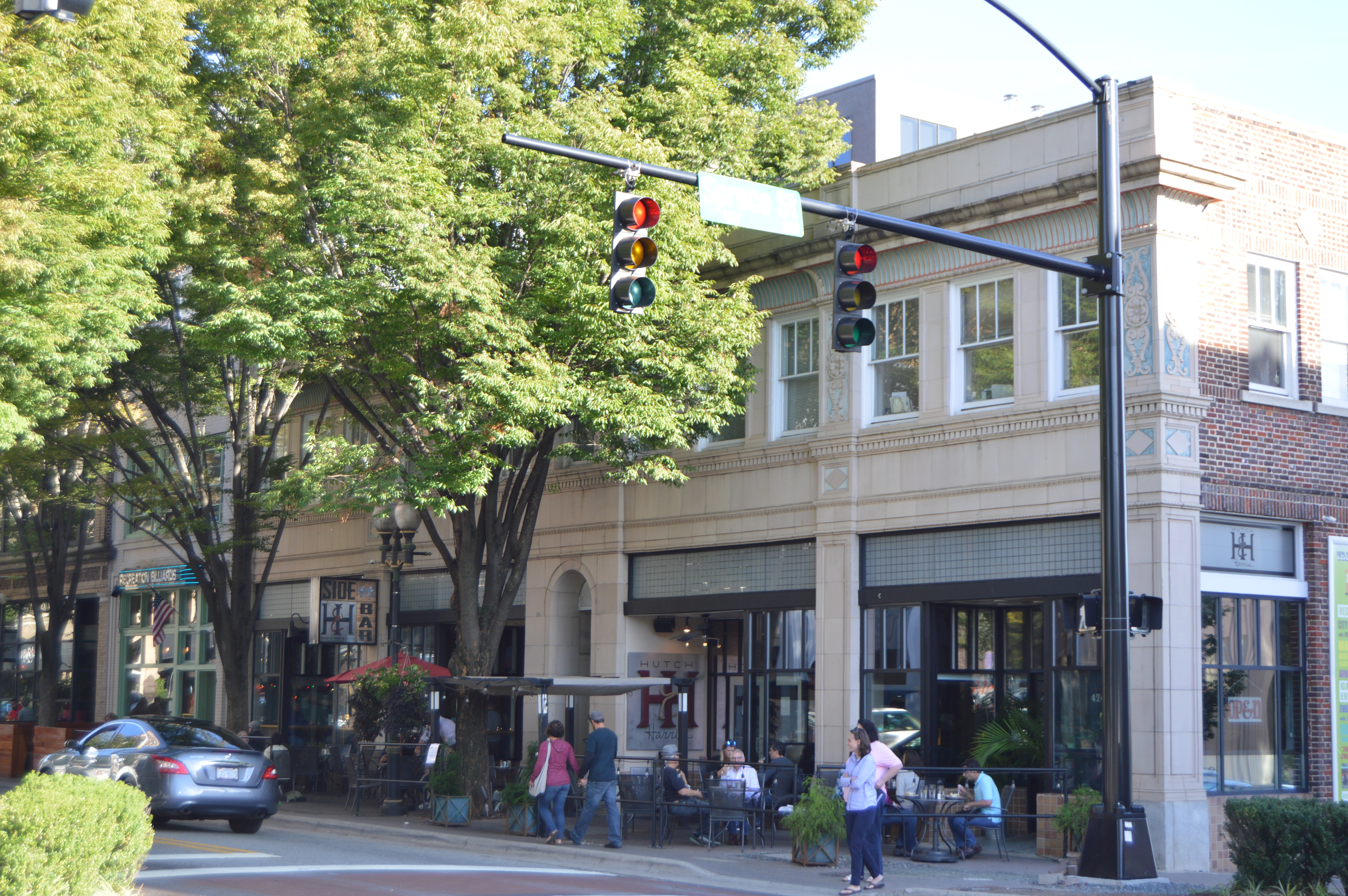
- Facade

- Location within North Carolina Location within the United States
- Location: 416-424 W. 4th St., Winston-Salem, North Carolina
- Coordinates: 36°5′50″N 80°14′24″W
- Area: less than one acre
- Built: 1924-1926
- Architect: Macklin, Harold
- Architectural style: Early Commercial
- NRHP reference No.: 82003452
- Added to NRHP: July 29, 1982

Gilmer Building is a historic commercial building located at Winston-Salem, Forsyth County, North Carolina. It was built between 1924 and 1926, and is a two-story, rectangular brick building. It measures 80 feet by 86 feet, and features polychromed terra cotta panels and ornamentation.

It was listed on the National Register of Historic Places in 1982.
