= Sunnyside–Central Terrace Historic District =

Historic district in North Carolina, United States

- Sunnyside-Central Terrace Historic District
- U.S. National Register of Historic Places
- U.S. Historic district
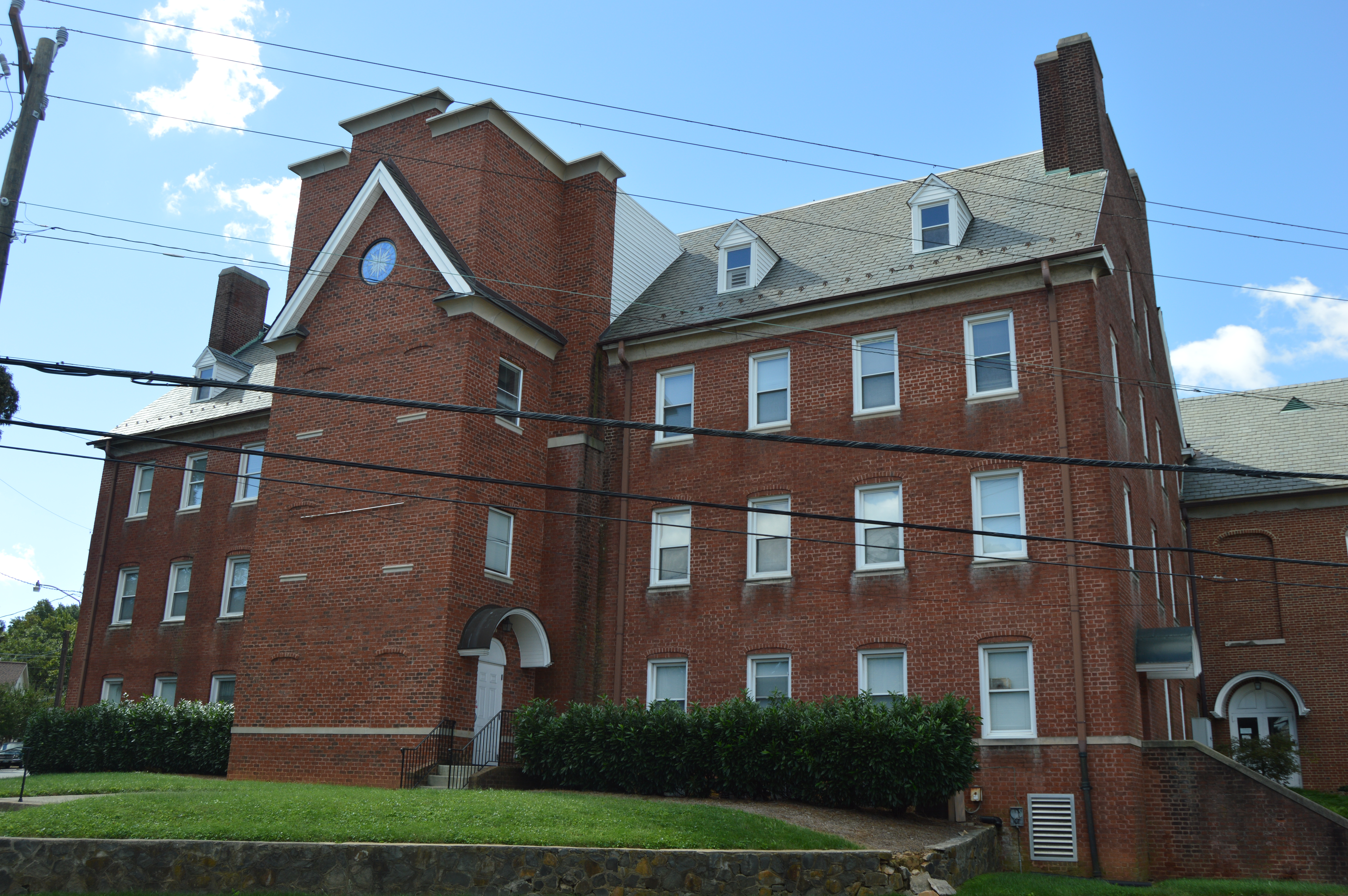
- Trinity Moravian Church on Sprague Street

- Location within North Carolina Location within the United States
- Location: Roughly bounded by Haled, Junia, Monmouth, Glendale, Goldfloss, Brookline & Main Sts., Winston-Salem, North Carolina
- Coordinates: 36°04′12″N 80°14′03″W
- Area: 140 acres (57 ha)
- Built: 1892
- Architectural style: Late Victorian, Late 19th And 20th Century Revivals
- NRHP reference No.: 08000380
- Added to NRHP: May 8, 2008

Sunnyside–Central Terrace Historic District is a national historic district located at Winston-Salem, Forsyth County, North Carolina. The district encompasses 425 contributing buildings in a predominantly residential section of Winston-Salem. The buildings date from about 1892 to 1958, and include notable examples of Colonial Revival, Late Victorian, and Bungalow / American Craftsman style architecture. Notable buildings include the Arista Mills (1950), Farmers Cooperative Exchange (c. 1945), Southern Steel Stampings (c. 1945), E. T. Baity Oil Co. (c. 1940), Central Terrace Methodist Church (1925, 1957), and Pine Chapel Moravian Church (1928).

It was listed on the National Register of Historic Places in 2008.
