= Brickenstein-Leinbach House =

Historic house in North Carolina, United States

- U.S. National Register of Historic Places
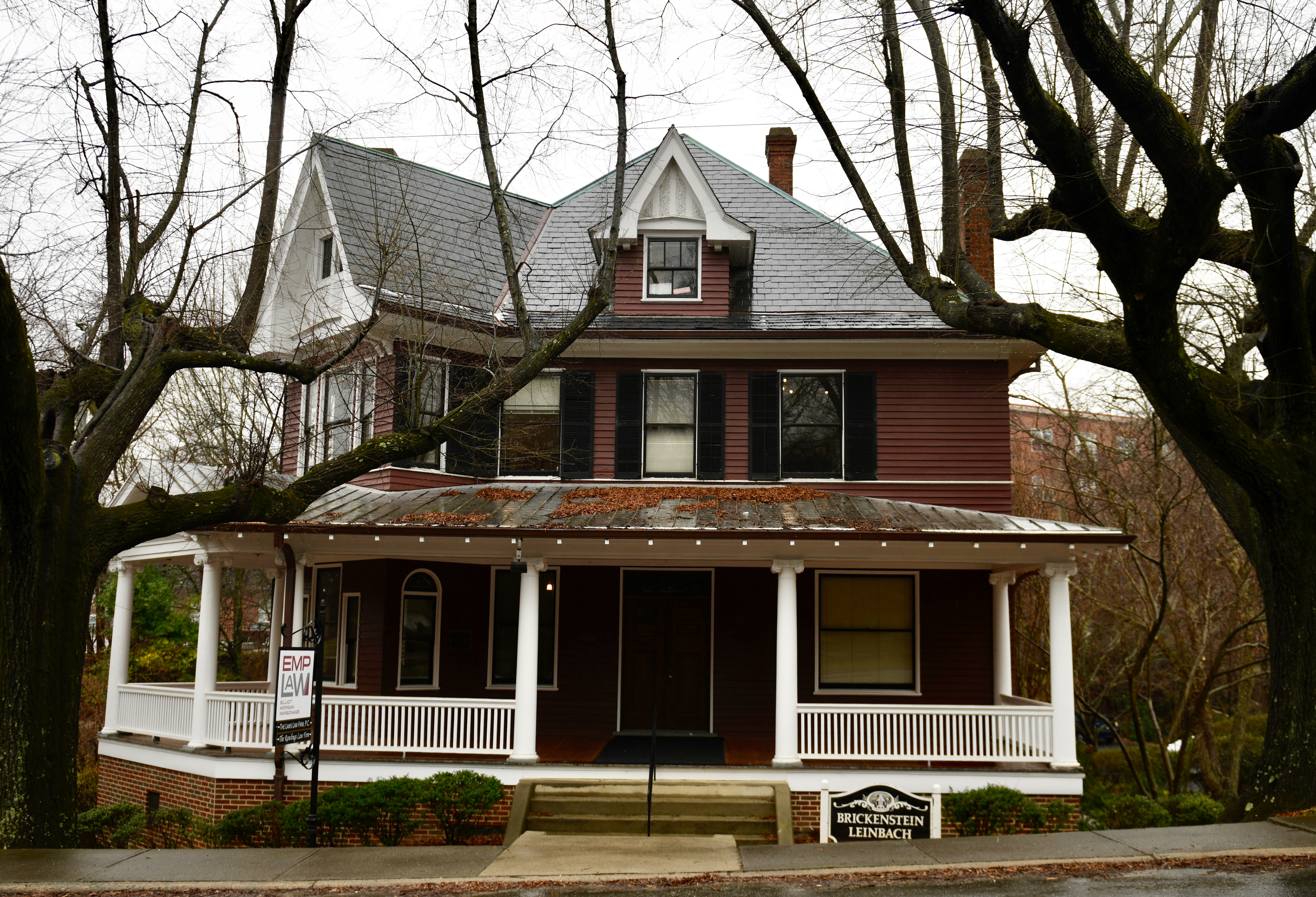

- Location within North Carolina Location within the United States
- Location: 426 Old Salem Rd. Winston-Salem, North Carolina
- Coordinates: 36°5′25″N 80°14′40″W
- Area: 0.8 acres (0.32 ha)
- Built: c. 1907
- Built by: Fogle Bros.
- Architect: Frank Pierce Milburn
- Architectural style: Classical Revival, Bungalow/craftsman, Queen Anne
- NRHP reference No.: 91001169
- Added to NRHP: September 3, 1991

Brickenstein-Leinbach House, also known as L.B. Brickenstein House, is a historic home located at Winston-Salem, Forsyth County, North Carolina. It was built around 1907 from a plan by Frank Pierce Milburn, and is a 2 1/2-story, three-bay, Queen Anne style frame dwelling. It has a high hipped slate roof, projecting bays, and a full-width porch with Corinthian order columns. A rear addition was built in the 1930s. The house was moved from 426 Main Street to its present site in 1990.

It was listed on the National Register of Historic Places in 1991.
