= James B. and Diana M. Dyer House =

Historic house in North Carolina, United States

- U.S. National Register of Historic Places
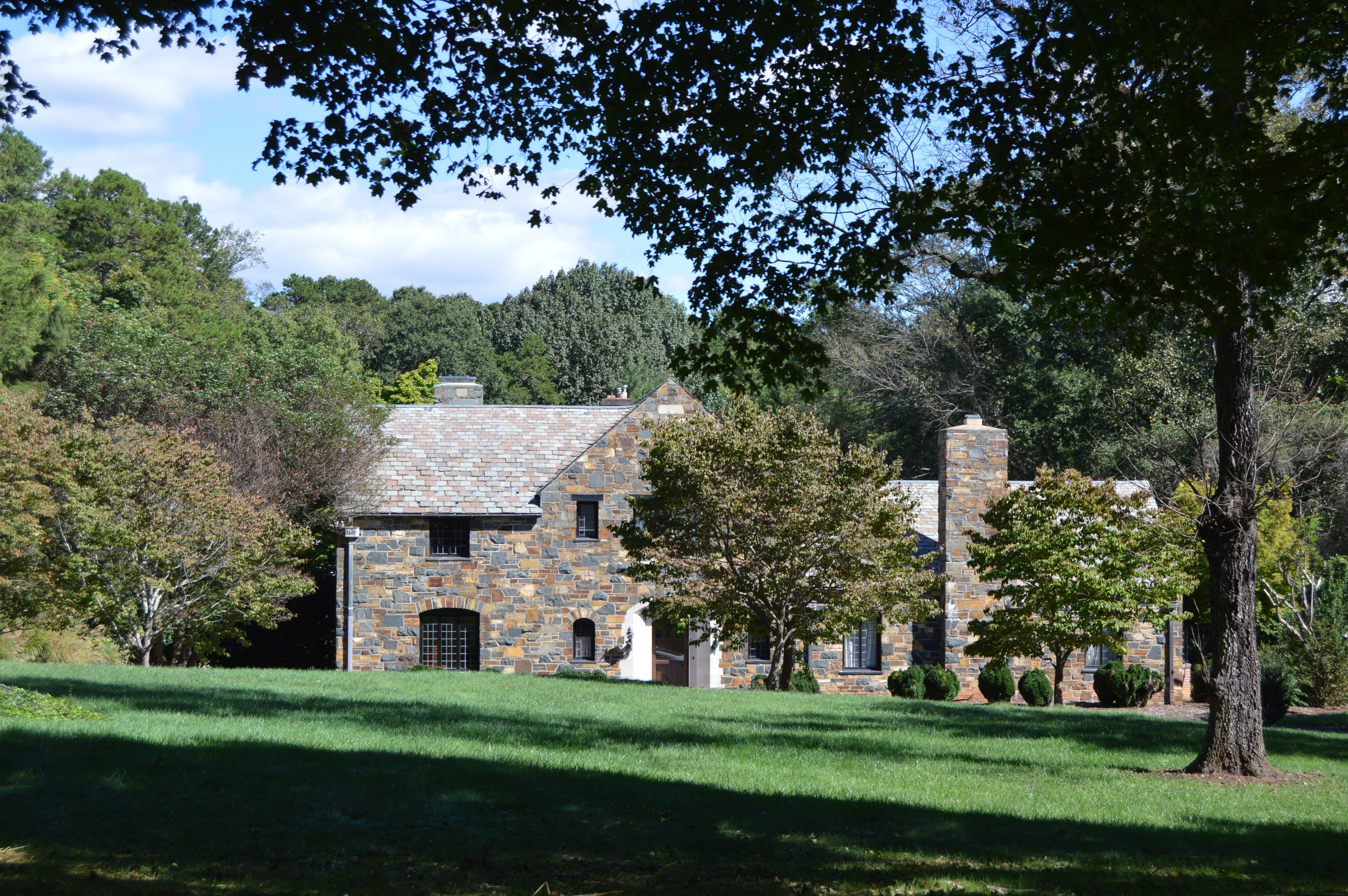
- Facade

- Location within North Carolina Location within the United States
- Location: 1015 W. Kent Rd., Winston-Salem, North Carolina
- Coordinates: 36°6′55″N 80°16′26″W
- Area: 2.4 acres (0.97 ha)
- Built: 1931
- Built by: Fogle Bros. Co.
- Architect: Mayers, Murray and Phillip
- Architectural style: Tudor Revival
- NRHP reference No.: 06000227
- Added to NRHP: April 5, 2006

James B. and Diana M. Dyer House, located in Winston-Salem, Forsyth County, North Carolina is a historic residence built in 1931. This large one- and two-story, irregularly-massed, Tudor Revival style dwelling with a rough-cut-stone exterior, has a green slate roof, stepped stone chimney, and metal casement windows. It was constructed for James Dyer, a prominent executive at R. J. Reynolds Tobacco Company.

It was listed on the National Register of Historic Places in 2006.
