= West End Historic District (Winston-Salem, North Carolina) =

Historic district in North Carolina, United States

- U.S. National Register of Historic Places
- U.S. Historic district
- Location within North Carolina Location within the United States
- Location: Roughly bounded by W. End Blvd., Sixth, Broad, and Fourth Sts., I-40, Sunset Dr., and Peters Creek, Winston-Salem, North Carolina
- Coordinates: 36°05′48″N 80°15′32″W
- Area: 229 acres (93 ha)
- Built: 1887
- Architect: Cram, Ralph Adams; Et al.
- Architectural style: Classical Revival, Queen Anne, Colonial Revival; Craftsman
- NRHP reference No.: 86003442
- Added to NRHP: December 4, 1986

West End Historic District is a national historic district located at Winston-Salem, Forsyth County, North Carolina. The district encompasses 508 contributing buildings and 7 contributing structures, in a predominantly residential section of Winston-Salem. It was a planned picturesque streetcar suburb developed at the turn of the 20th century. The buildings date from about 1887 to 1930, and include notable examples of Classical Revival, Colonial Revival, Queen Anne, and Bungalow / American Craftsman style architecture. Located in the district are the separately listed H. D. Poindexter Houses and Zevely House. Other notable buildings include the St. Paul's Episcopal Church (1928-1929) designed by Ralph Adams Cram, Augsburg Lutheran Church (1926), Friends Meeting House (1927), the First Church of Christ, Scientist (1924), and Joyner's West End Grocery.

It was listed on the National Register of Historic Places in 1986.
