= Holly Avenue Historic District =

Historic district in North Carolina, United States

- U.S. National Register of Historic Places
- U.S. Historic district
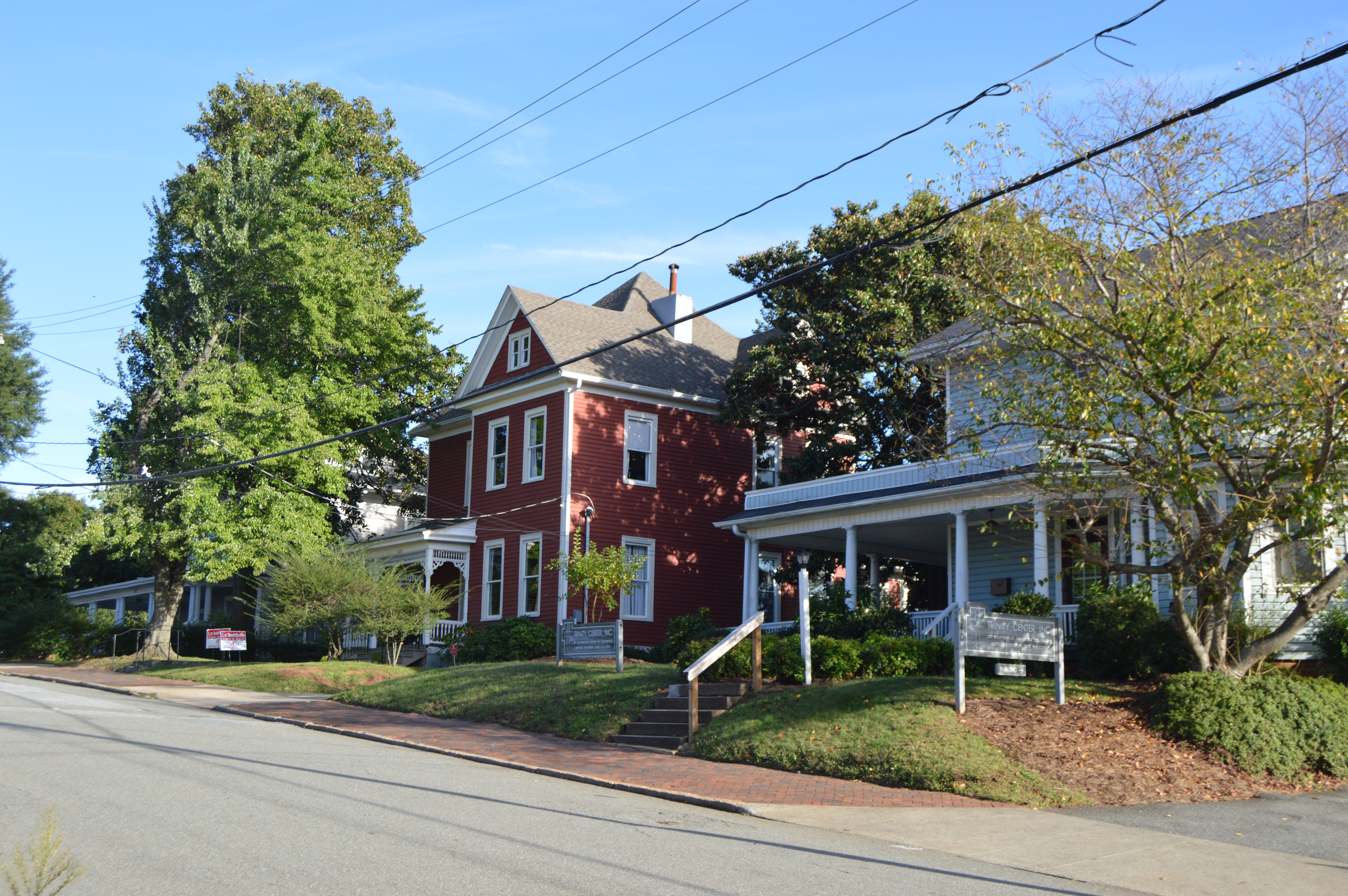
- Houses on the 600 block of Holly

- Location within North Carolina Location within the United States
- Location: Roughly bounded by Broad and Marshall Sts., Holly Ave. and Business I-40, Winston-Salem, North Carolina
- Coordinates: 36°05′39″N 80°15′14″W
- Area: 59 acres (24 ha)
- Built: 1885
- Built by: Blum, Peter; McIver, Irvin
- Architectural style: Queen Anne, Italianate, et al.
- NRHP reference No.: 02000442
- Added to NRHP: May 2, 2002

Holly Avenue Historic District is a national historic district located at Winston-Salem, Forsyth County, North Carolina. The district encompasses 115 contributing buildings and 1 contributing site in a predominantly residential section of Winston-Salem. The buildings date between about 1885 and 1952, and include single family dwellings and apartment building. The include examples of late-19th and early-20th popular architectural styles including the Queen Anne and Italianate style. Notable buildings include the Henry Case House (c. 1885), James Jessup House (c. 1889), Henry Foltz bam (1906), Calvary Moravian Church (1923), T. R. Brann's store (c. 1921), and Green Front Grocery (c. 1937).

It was listed on the National Register of Historic Places in 2002.
