= Pfafftown, North Carolina =

- Unincorporated community
- Location within North Carolina Location within the United States
- Coordinates: 36°9′12″N 80°21′40″W
- Country: United States
- State: North Carolina
- County: Forsyth
- Named for: Peter Pfaff

Population (2000)
  - Total: 2,043
- Time zone: UTC-5 (Eastern (EST))
  - Summer (DST): UTC-4 (EDT)
- ZIP code: 27040
- Area codes: 336 and 743

Pfafftown (/ˈpɑːftaʊn/ PAHF-town) is an unincorporated community in North Carolina, United States which has been partially annexed into the cities of Winston-Salem in Forsyth County and Lewisville, also in Forsyth County. As of the 2000 census, the ZCTA of Pfafftown had a population of 2,043. It is a Piedmont Triad community.

== History ==
In 1784, Peter Pfaff Sr. bought land west of Muddy Creek. A post office came to the community in 1888.

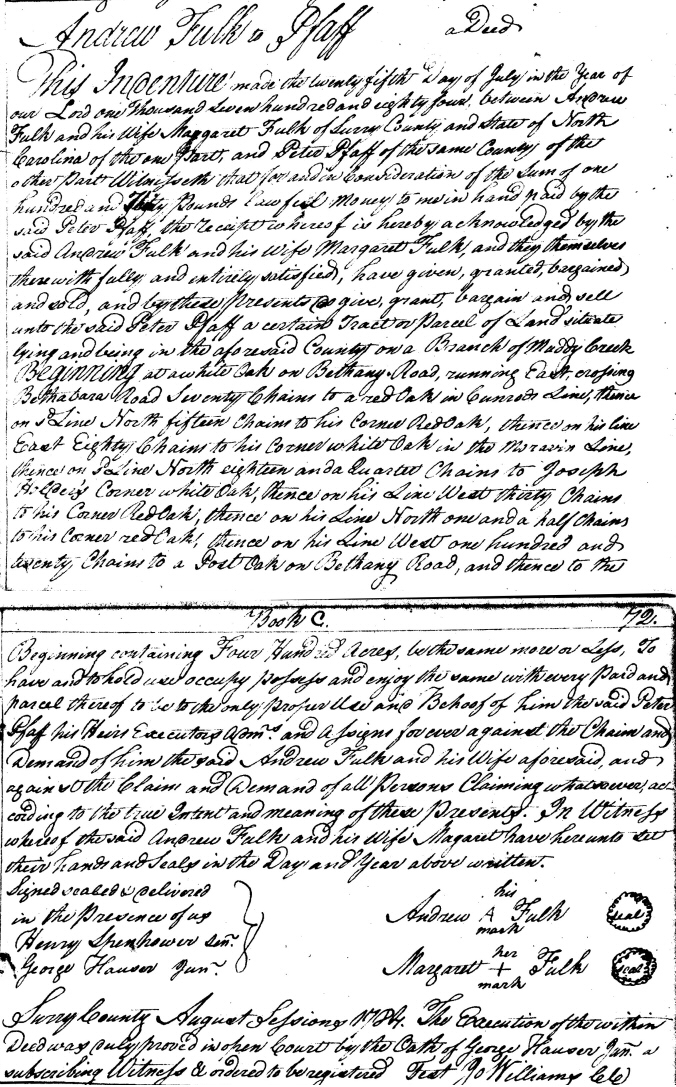
1784 deed to Peter Pfaff for land on Muddy Creek

Pfaff's house, the John Jacob Schaub House and Waller House are listed on the National Register of Historic Places.

After Clemmons and Lewisville incorporated, Pfafftown tried in 2001 to do the same but was not successful. Instead, much of the community was annexed by Lewisville or Winston-Salem in 2006.

== Demographics ==
Pfafftown's Zip Code Tabulation Area (ZCTA) has a population of about 2,043 as of the 2000 census. The population is about 49% male and 51% female. About 86.6% of the population is white, 8% African-American, 3.2% American Indian, 0.6% Asian, 1.5% Hispanic, and 0.8% of another race. 0.9% of people are two or more races. There are no native Hawaiians or other Pacific islanders.

The average household size is 2.6 people, and the average family has 2.9 people. There are 3,783 houses, with 94.5% of them occupied, 91% bought and 3.5% rented. There are 214 vacant housing units.

== Transportation ==
Major roads in Pfafftown include Yadkinville Road, which goes through the community, connecting Reynolda Road in Winston-Salem to Old US-421 and eventually to Yadkinville. NC 67 bypasses the community, also connecting NC 150 in Winston-Salem to U.S. Route 21 in Jonesville. Other major routes include, Transou Road, connecting NC 67 to Yadkinville Road; Skylark Road, connecting Transou Road to Vienna-Dozier Road; and Lewisville-Vienna Road, connecting Yadkinville Road to Shallowford Road in Lewisville.

== Notable people ==
- George Greer (born 1946), baseball coach
- Shavon Revel, football player
- Jim Drake (1929–2012), aeronautics engineer
- Craig Engels (born 1994), runner
- Chandalae Lanouette, dancer and entertainment manager for the Carolina Panthers
