= Craver Apartment Building =

Historic building in North Carolina, US

- U.S. National Register of Historic Places
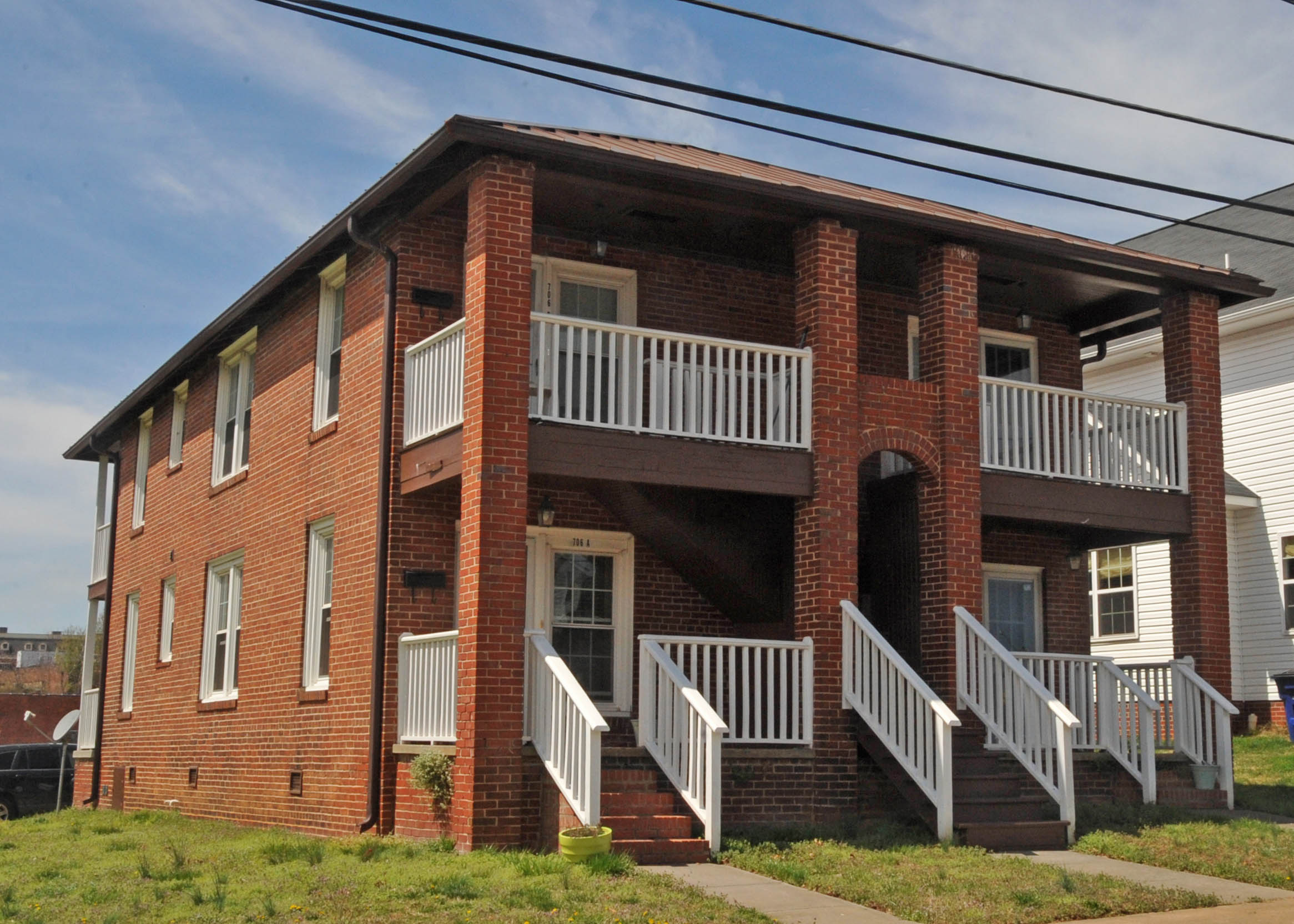
- Craver Apartment Building, September 2007

- Location within North Carolina Location within the United States
- Location: 706-712 Chestnut St., Winston-Salem, North Carolina
- Coordinates: 36°6′10″N 80°14′33″W
- Area: less than one acre
- Built: c. 1942
- Architectural style: Bungalow/craftsman
- MPS: African-American Neighborhoods in Northeastern Winston-Salem MPS
- NRHP reference No.: 98000726
- Added to NRHP: June 26, 1998

Craver Apartment Building is a historic apartment building located at Winston-Salem, Forsyth County, North Carolina. It was built about 1942, and is a two-story, five-bay, brick-veneered rectangular block structure with hipped roof and exposed rafter ends. It has a hipped roof and exposed rafter ends in the Bungalow / American Craftsman style. It features porches on both levels supported by full-height square brick posts. The building was built as rental apartments for African-American families just before World War II.

It was listed on the National Register of Historic Places in 1998.
