= South Trade Street Houses =

Historic houses in North Carolina, United States

- U.S. National Register of Historic Places
- Location within North Carolina Location within the United States
- Location: 434, 440, and 448 S. Trade St., Winston-Salem, North Carolina
- Coordinates: 36°5′20″N 80°14′45″W
- Area: 2 acres (0.81 ha)
- Built: 1838, 1856, 1857
- NRHP reference No.: 78001953
- Added to NRHP: December 11, 1978

South Trade Street Houses are a set of three historic homes located at Winston-Salem, Forsyth County, North Carolina. They are known as the Sussdorf, Ackerman and Patterson Houses and associated with the Moravian community of Salem. The Sussdorf House was built in 1838, and is a two-story, four-bay-by-two-bay brick dwelling. The Ackerman House was built in 1856, and is a two-story brick dwelling with a full-width, hip-roof Victorian porch. The Patterson House was built in 1857, and is a two-story, three-bay-by-two-bay brick dwelling.

It was listed on the National Register of Historic Places in 1978.
