= Zevely House =

Historic house in North Carolina, United States

- U.S. National Register of Historic Places
- U.S. Historic district – Contributing property
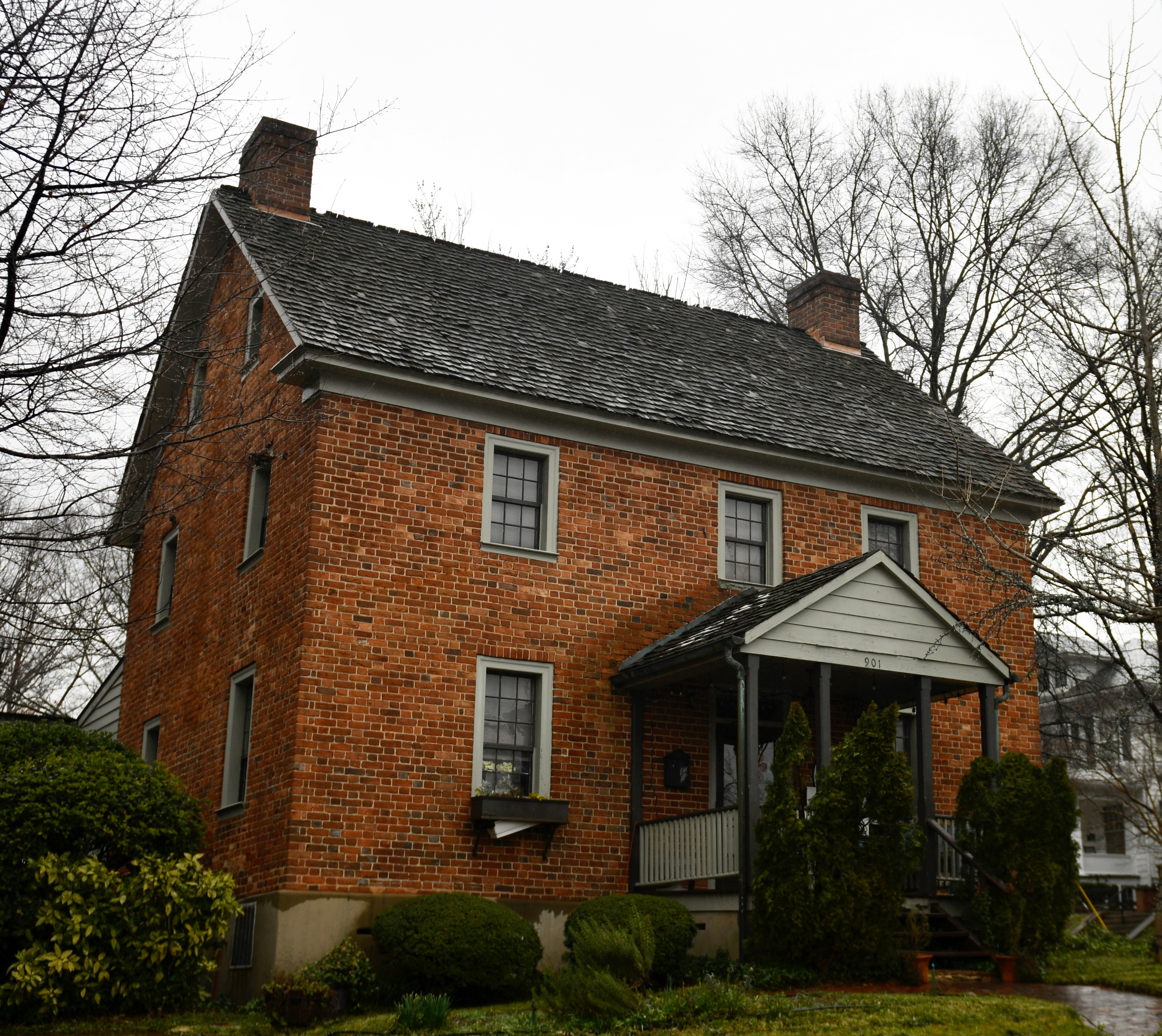

- Location within North Carolina Location within the United States
- Interactive map showing the location of Zevely House
- Location: 901 West Fourth Street; Winston-Salem, North Carolina
- Coordinates: 36°5′49″N 80°15′26″W
- Area: 0.3 acres (0.12 ha)
- Built: c. 1815
- Part of: West End Historic District (ID86003442)
- NRHP reference No.: 73001341
- Added to NRHP: April 24, 1973

Zevely House is a historic home in Winston-Salem, Forsyth County, North Carolina.

== History ==
The Zevely House was built about 1815 by Vannimmen Zively, who married Johanna Sophia Shober in 1809 and bought from his step-father the same year the 160-acre land where he erected the house 6 years later, on Old Town Road. The house was moved in 1974 from its original site at 734 Oak Street to a new site at 901 West Fourth Street. It was subsequently restored (1974-1975) and houses a restaurant.

It was listed on the National Register of Historic Places in 1973. It is in the West End Historic District.

== Description ==
The Zevely House is a two-story, three bay by two bay brick dwelling in the German-influenced North Carolina Moravian style. It has a one-story rear shed addition and full-width front entrance porch.
