= Washington Park Historic District (Winston-Salem, North Carolina) =

Historic district in North Carolina, United States

- U.S. National Register of Historic Places
- U.S. Historic district
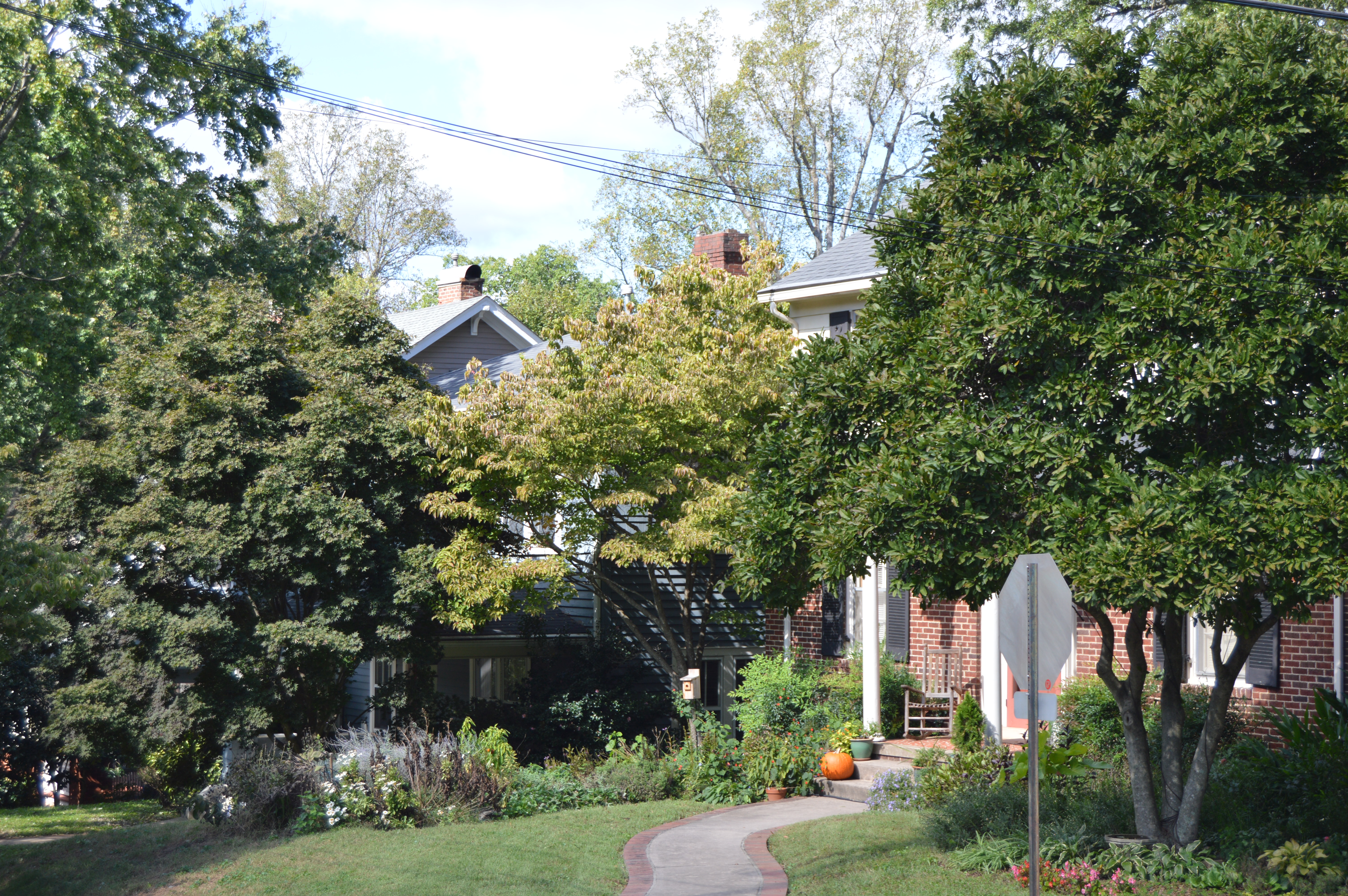
- Houses on Cascade Avenue

- Location within North Carolina Location within the United States
- Location: Roughly bounded by Leonard St., Acadia Ave., Sunnyside Ave., Vintage Ave., Broad St., Bond St. and Washington Park, Winston-Salem, North Carolina
- Coordinates: 36°04′25″N 80°14′38″W
- Area: 145 acres (59 ha)
- Built: 1892
- Architect: Multiple
- Architectural style: Colonial Revival, Bungalow/craftsman, Queen Anne
- NRHP reference No.: 91001960
- Added to NRHP: January 13, 1992

Washington Park Historic District, also known as the Southside Neighborhood, is a national historic district located at Winston-Salem, Forsyth County, North Carolina. The district encompasses 348 contributing buildings, 1 contributing site (Washington Park), and 2 contributing structures, in a predominantly residential section of Winston-Salem. It was a planned speculative development centered on a streetcar line. The buildings date from about 1892 to 1940, and include notable examples of Colonial Revival, Queen Anne, and Bungalow / American Craftsman style architecture. Notable buildings include the Schlatter Memorial Reformed Church (1916).

It was listed on the National Register of Historic Places in 1992.
