= H. D. Poindexter Houses =

Historic houses in North Carolina, United States

- U.S. National Register of Historic Places
- U.S. Historic district – Contributing property
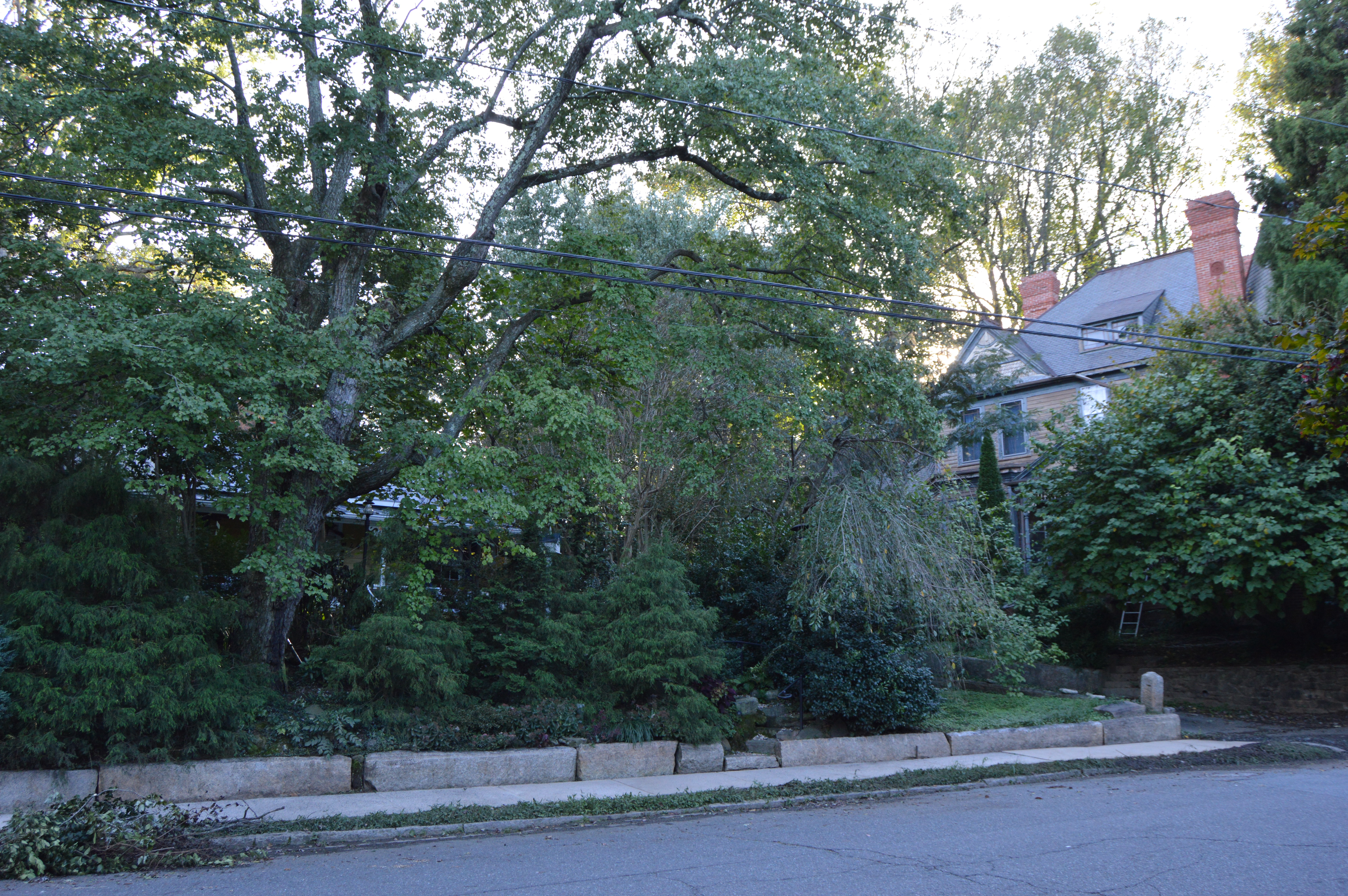
- Street view

- Location within North Carolina Location within the United States
- Location: 124 and 130 West End Blvd., Winston-Salem, North Carolina
- Coordinates: 36°6′3″N 80°15′11″W
- Area: 0.8 acres (0.32 ha)
- Built: 1874, 1892-1894
- Architectural style: Queen Anne
- NRHP reference No.: 78001950
- Added to NRHP: July 31, 1978

H. D. Poindexter Houses are a set of historic homes located at Winston-Salem, Forsyth County, North Carolina. A large house was built between 1892 and 1894, and is a two-story, frame dwelling in the Queen Anne style. It features verandahs, balconies, ornamental shingles, and large medieval-like chimneys. Associated with the large house is a small Victorian cottage built around 1874. Both dwellings were built by Henry Dalton Poindexter, a prominent merchant. They were moved to their present location in December 1977.

It was listed on the National Register of Historic Places in 1979. It is located in the West End Historic District.
