= Clayton Family Farm =

Historic farm in North Carolina, United States

- U.S. National Register of Historic Places
- U.S. Historic district
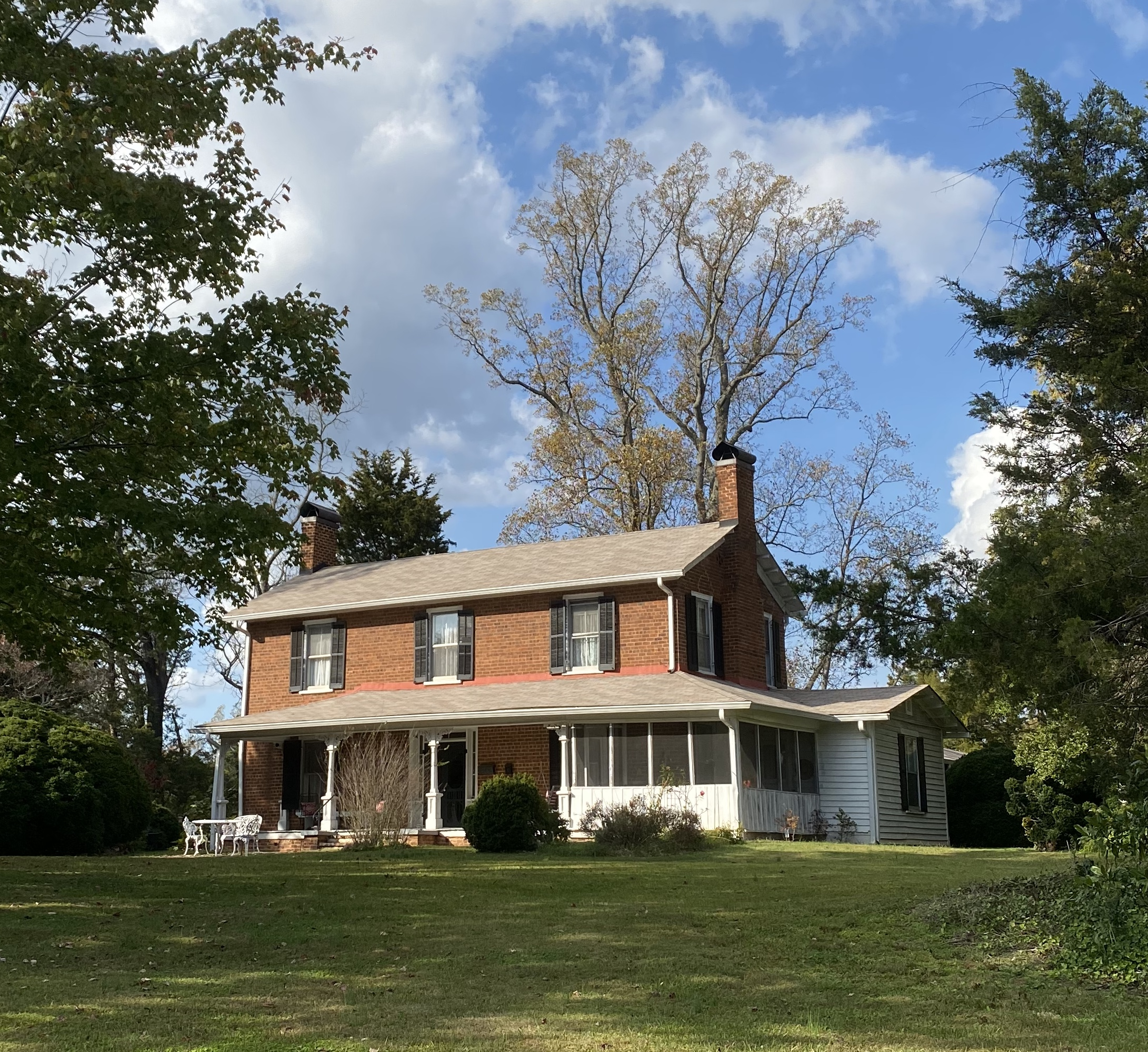

- Location within North Carolina Location within the United States
- Location: 5809 Stanley Dr., Stanleyville, North Carolina
- Coordinates: 36°12′03″N 80°16′19″W
- Area: 25 acres (10 ha)
- Built: 1800
- Architectural style: Greek Revival, Single pen log
- NRHP reference No.: 01001072
- Added to NRHP: October 5, 2001

Clayton Family Farm, also known as John and Matthew Clayton Farm, is a historic farm complex and national historic district located at Stanleyville, Forsyth County, North Carolina. The district encompasses eight contributing buildings and four contributing sites dated between about 1800 and 1931. They include two historic roadbeds, an historic pond site, the weatherboarded log John Clayton House (c. 1800), the brick Greek Revival-style brick Matthew C. Clayton House (1879), the former Clayton Store, five log and frame outbuildings, and the family cemetery.

It was listed on the National Register of Historic Places in 2001.
