= Winston-Salem Tobacco Historic District =

Historic district in North Carolina, United States

- U.S. National Register of Historic Places
- U.S. Historic district
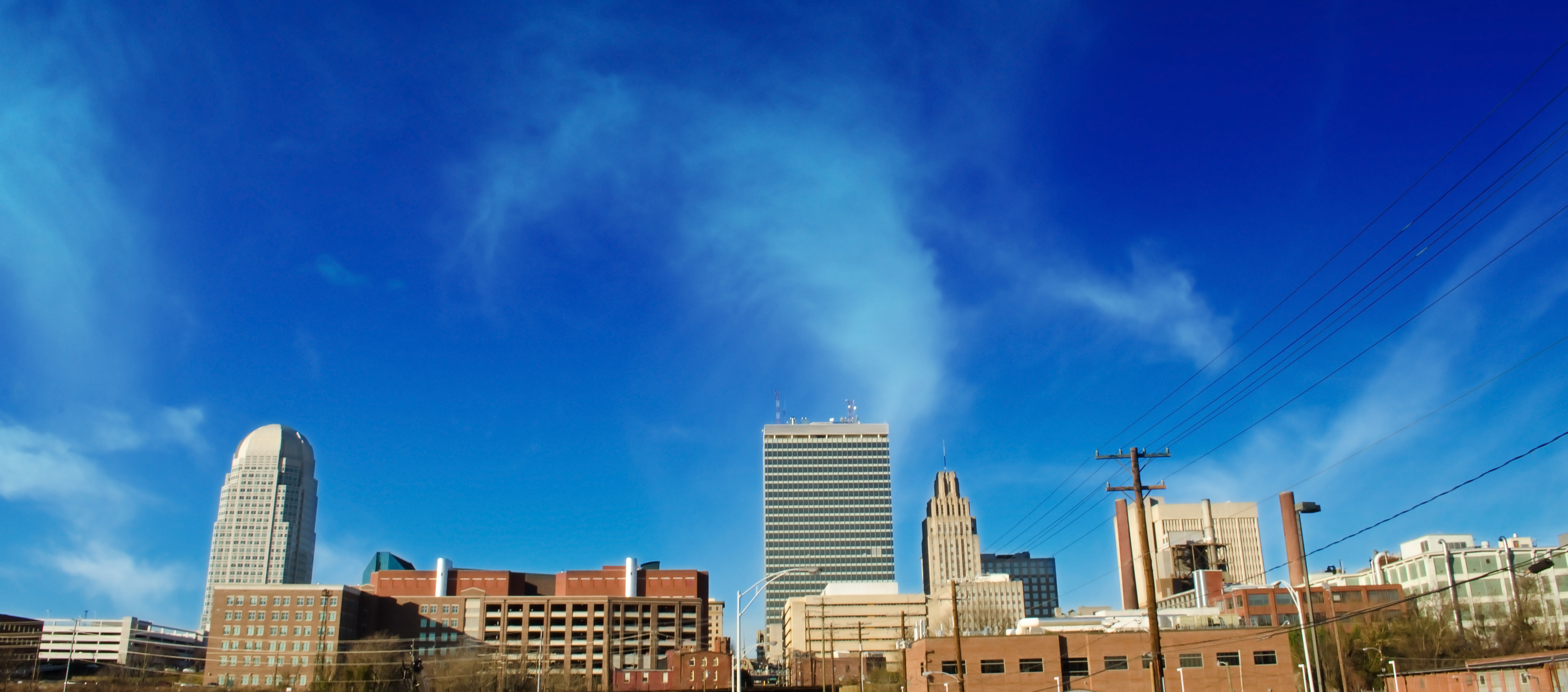
- View of Downtown Winston-Salem, December 2011

- Location within North Carolina Location within the United States
- Location: Bounded by Chestnut St. on the W., 5th and 7th Sts. on the N., Linden St. on the E., and 4th and Fogle Sts. on the S., Winston-Salem, North Carolina
- Coordinates: 36°06′02″N 80°14′24″W
- Area: 31 acres (13 ha)
- Built: 1890
- Built by: J.E. Sirrine and Company
- Architectural style: Romanesque, Second Empire, Commercial Style
- NRHP reference No.: 09000602
- Added to NRHP: August 5, 2009

Winston-Salem Tobacco Historic District is a national historic district located at Winston-Salem, Forsyth County, North Carolina. The district encompasses 16 contributing buildings and 16 contributing structures in a predominantly industrial section of Winston-Salem. The buildings date from about 1890 to 1959, and include buildings relating to the tobacco industry, specifically R. J. Reynolds Tobacco Company. Also on the district are a once-thriving African American and the wholesale commercial business district that once catered to the R. J. Reynolds Tobacco Company workers. Located in the district is the separately listed Romanesque Revival style S. J. Nissen Building and Piedmont Leaf Tobacco Company.

It was listed on the National Register of Historic Places in 2009.
