= Waller House =

Historic house in North Carolina, United States

- U.S. National Register of Historic Places
- Location within North Carolina Location within the United States
- Location: 9186 Reynolda Rd., near Pfafftown, North Carolina
- Coordinates: 36°12′20″N 80°24′57″W
- Area: 12.56 acres (5.08 ha)
- Built: c. 1770–1790, c. 1800–1820
- Architectural style: hewn log dwelling
- NRHP reference No.: 14000519
- Added to NRHP: August 25, 2014

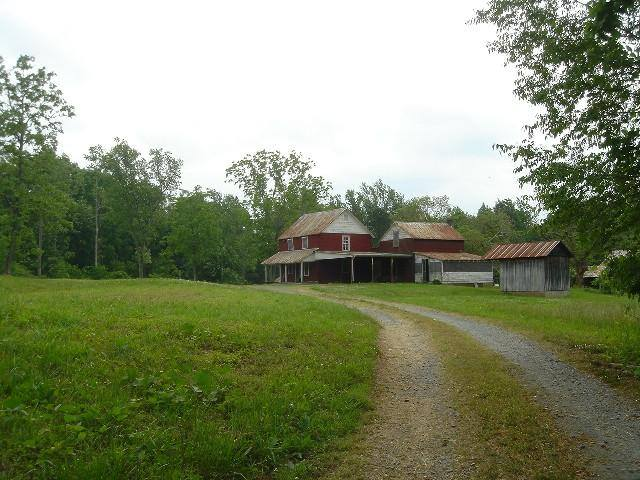
Waller House in 2014

Waller House, also known as the Waller-Joyner Farm, is a historic home near Pfafftown, North Carolina. The original 1 1/2-story hewn log dwelling was built about 1770–1790 and was later used as a kitchen. It is located adjacent to a 2-story hewn log dwelling built about 1800–1820. An open L-shaped porch was added in the 1940s connecting the two dwellings.

It was listed on the National Register of Historic Places in 2014.
