= Centerville Historic District (Winston-Salem, North Carolina) =

Historic district in North Carolina, United States

- U.S. National Register of Historic Places
- U.S. Historic district
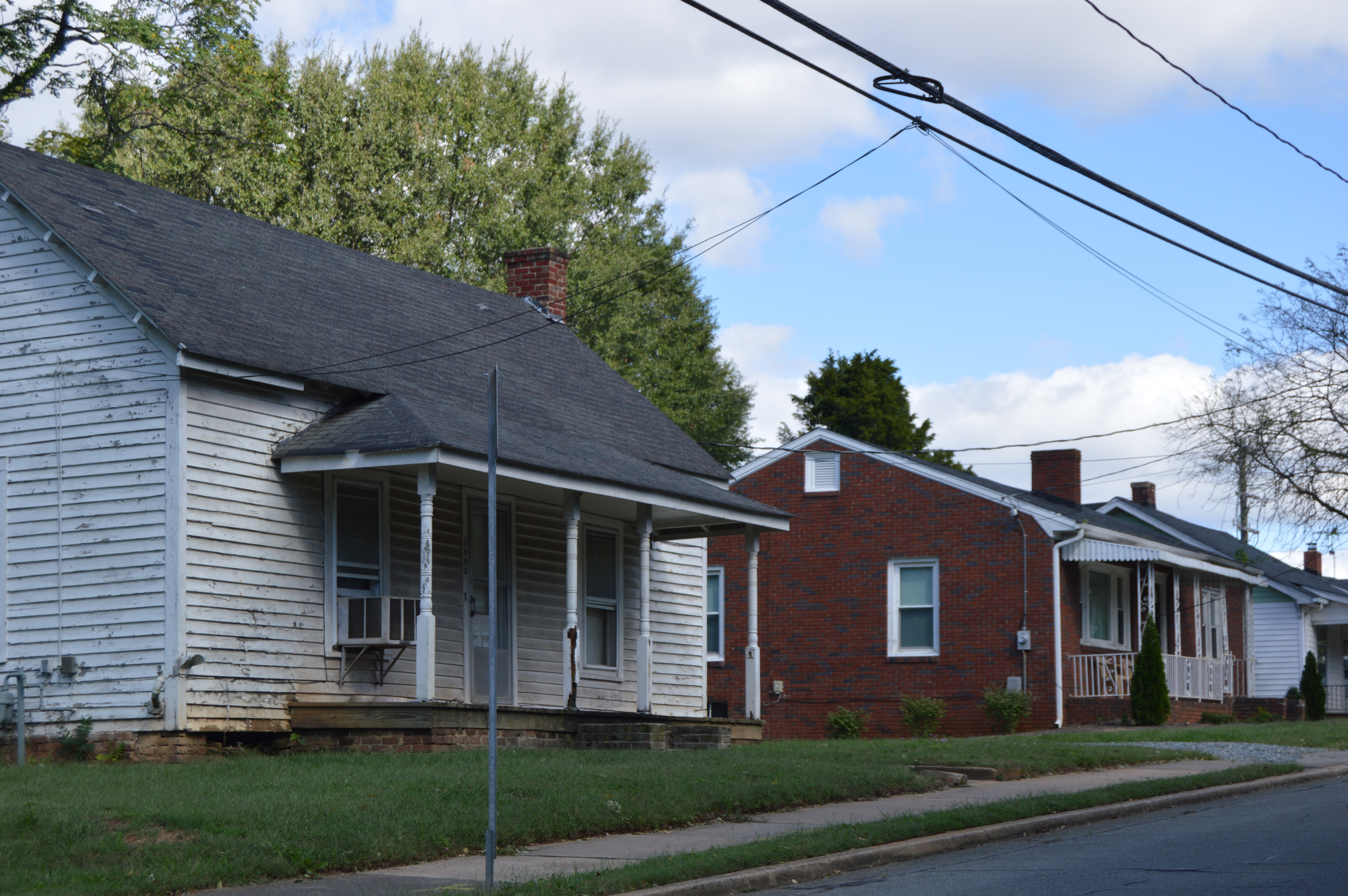
- Housing on Chapel Street

- Location within North Carolina Location within the United States
- Location: Roughly bounded by Waughtown, Vargrave, Haled & Chapel Sts., winston-Salem, North Carolina
- Coordinates: 36°04′23″N 80°13′58″W
- Area: 15 acres (6.1 ha)
- Architectural style: Late 19th And Early 20th Century American Movements, Modern Movement
- NRHP reference No.: 08000379
- Added to NRHP: May 8, 2008

Centerville Historic District is a national historic district in Winston-Salem, Forsyth County, North Carolina. The district encompasses 91 contributing buildings and 1 contributing structure in Winston-Salem. It includes a mix of residential, commercial, and light industrial buildings built between about 1900 and 1950. Residential buildings are in a mix of architectural styles including Queen Anne, Bungalow / American Craftsman, and Minimal Traditional.

It was listed on the National Register of Historic Places in 2008.
