= Hoots Milling Company Roller Mill =

- U.S. National Register of Historic Places
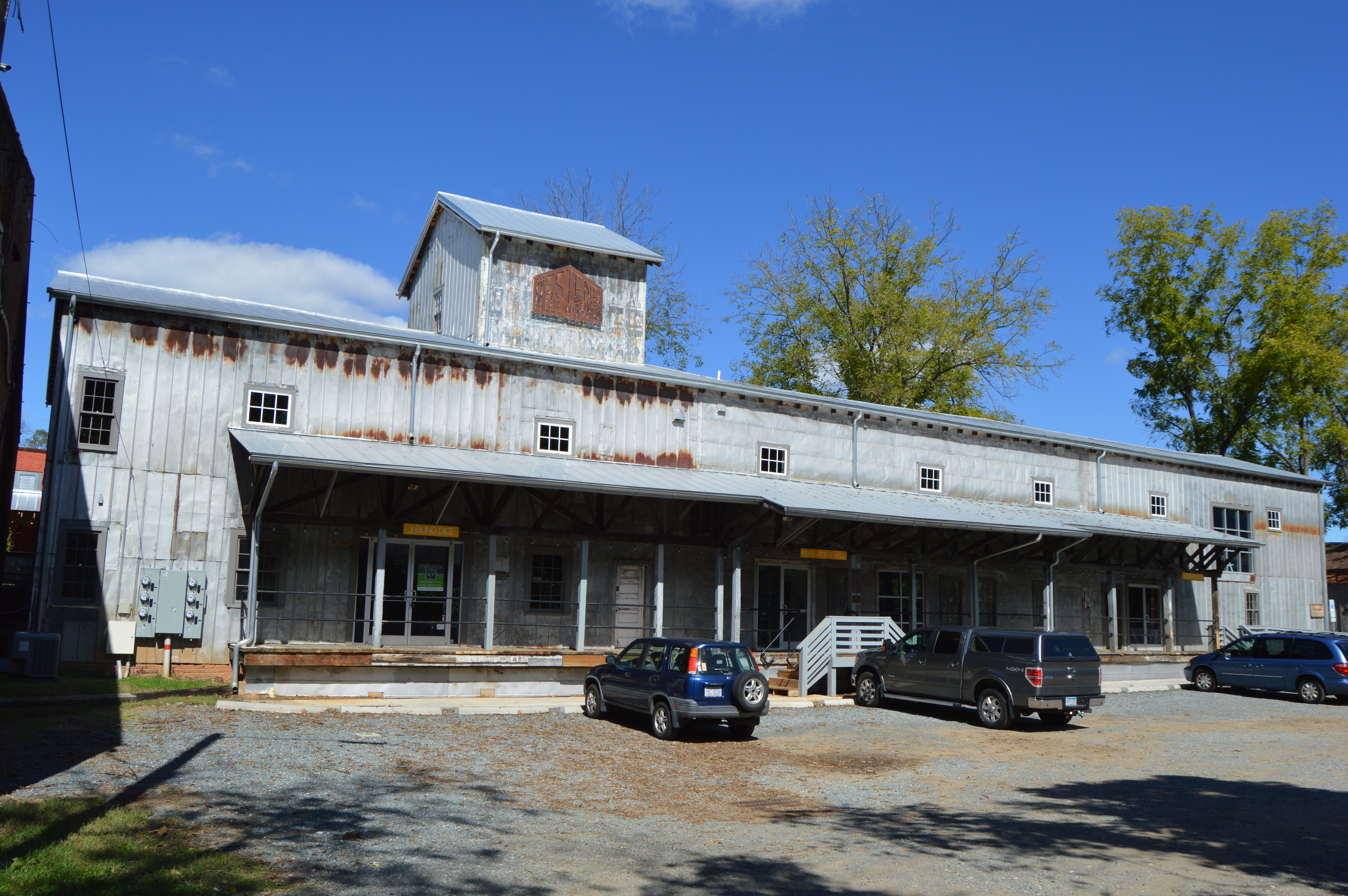
- Facade

- Location within North Carolina Location within the United States
- Location: 1151 Canal Dr., Winston-Salem, North Carolina
- Coordinates: 36°06′12″N 80°15′35″W
- Area: 0.5 acres (0.20 ha)
- Built: c. 1935-1937
- Architectural style: Heavy timber mill construction
- NRHP reference No.: 14000227
- Added to NRHP: May 19, 2014

Hoots Milling Company Roller Mill, also known as Charles A. Bunn Company Office and Warehouse, is a historic roller mill and warehouse located at Winston-Salem, Forsyth County, North Carolina. The mill was built about 1935, and is a two-story heavy timber and frame building, with an attached two-story heavy timber and frame warehouse built about 1937. A one-story, metal-sided, front-gable-roofed, warehouse was built in the 1930s. A one-story warehouse added in the 1950s connected the two buildings. The mill incorporates a gabled grain elevator.

It was listed on the National Register of Historic Places in 2014.
