= W. F. Smith and Sons Leaf House and Brown Brothers Company Building =

- U.S. National Register of Historic Places
- U.S. Historic district – Contributing property
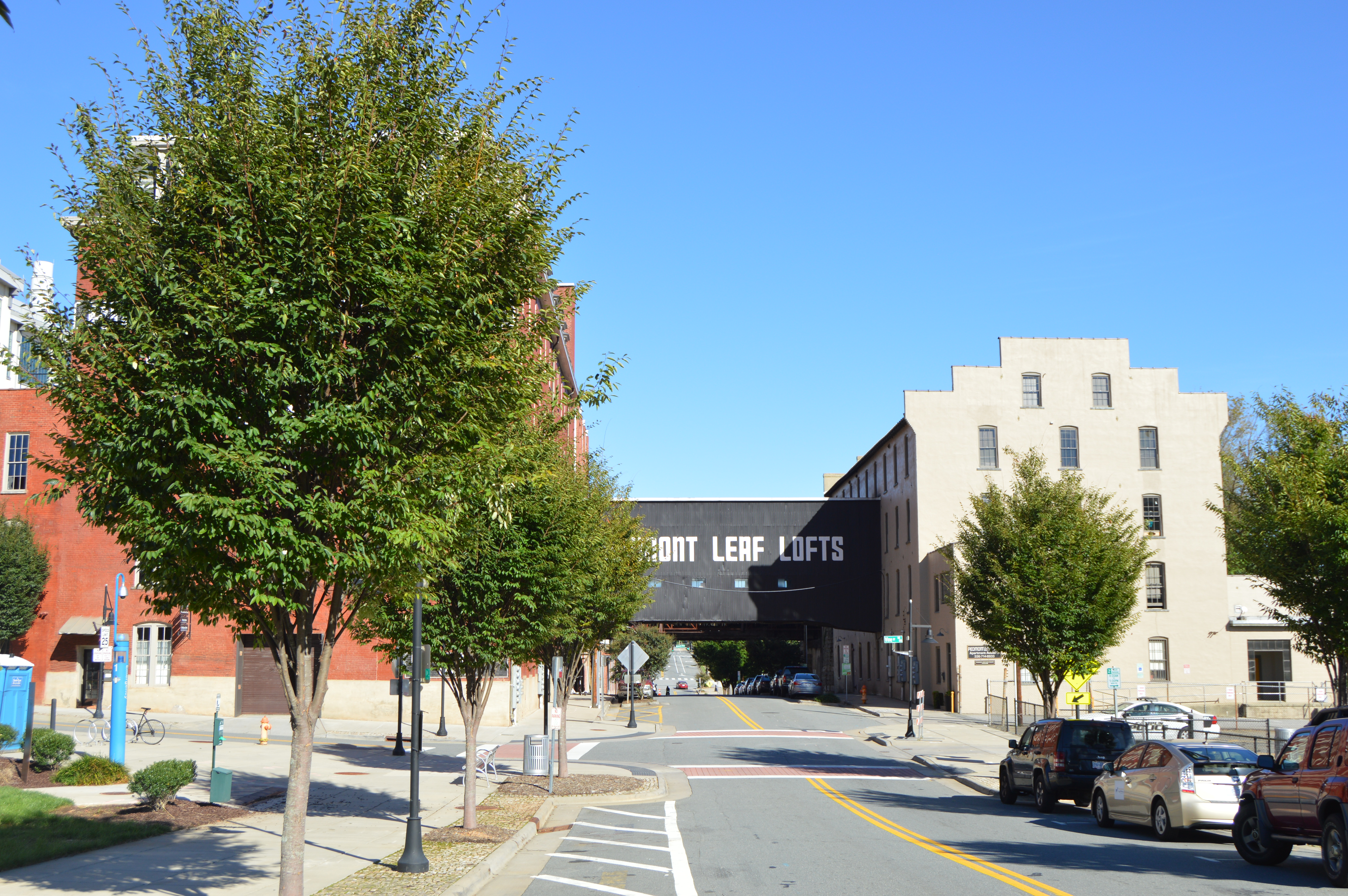
- Overview from west

- Location within North Carolina Location within the United States
- Location: 4th St. between Patterson and Linden, Winston-Salem, North Carolina
- Coordinates: 36°5′58″N 80°14′28″W
- Area: less than one acre
- Built: 1890-1895
- NRHP reference No.: 78001952
- Added to NRHP: February 23, 1978

W. F. Smith and Sons Leaf House and Brown Brothers Company Building, also known as Piedmont Leaf Tobacco Co., is a historic tobacco manufacturing complex located at Winston-Salem, Forsyth County, North Carolina. The complex includes two buildings. The W. F. Smith and Sons Leaf House was built about 1890, and is a 4 1/2-story, nine bays long and three bays wide, stuccoed brick building with a stepped gable facade. The former Brown Brothers building, was built between 1890 and 1895, and is a five-story brick building with a mansard roof and hip roof dormer windows. By 1900 both buildings housed tobacco prizeries.

It was listed on the National Register of Historic Places in 1978. It is located in the Winston-Salem Tobacco Historic District.
