= S. J. Nissen Building =

Historic building in North Carolina, US

- U.S. National Register of Historic Places
- U.S. Historic district – Contributing property
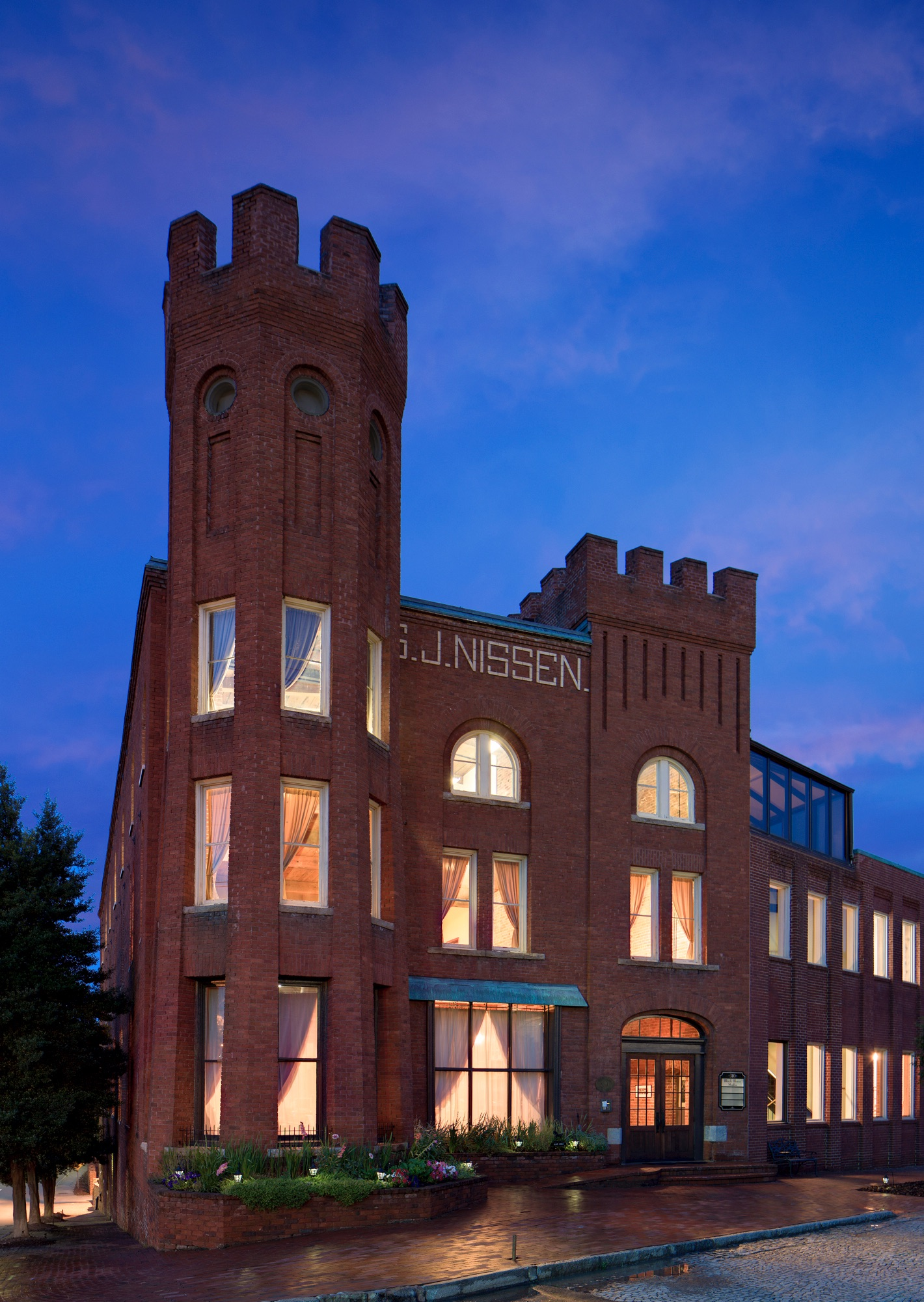

- Location within North Carolina Location within the United States
- Location: 310 E. Third St., Winston-Salem, North Carolina
- Coordinates: 36°5′52″N 80°14′26″W
- Area: 0.5 acres (0.20 ha)
- Architectural style: Romanesque
- NRHP reference No.: 07000820
- Added to NRHP: August 16, 2007

S. J. Nissen Building, also known as S. J. Nissen Carriage Repository and Repair Shop, S. J. Nissen Company Wagonworks, Kester Machinery Company, and Black Horse Studio is a historic factory building located at Winston-Salem, Forsyth County, North Carolina. The original 1893 primary structure is a three-story Romanesque Revival style brick building with a basement and sub basement. It features two crenellated front towers (one square and one octagonal) and round-arched windows. A two-story addition with basement was added in 1953. The building originally housed a wagon making and repair shop and a carriage repository.

It was listed on the National Register of Historic Places in 2007. It is located in the Winston-Salem Tobacco Historic District.
