= John Jacob Schaub House =

Historic house in North Carolina, United States

- U.S. National Register of Historic Places
- Location within North Carolina Location within the United States
- Location: Northeast of Vienna off SR 1455, Pfafftown, North Carolina
- Coordinates: 36°10′4″N 80°22′50″W
- Area: 10.5 acres (4.2 ha)
- Built: 1829-1830
- Built by: Schaub, John Jacob
- Architectural style: Georgian
- NRHP reference No.: 82001296
- Added to NRHP: October 7, 1982

John Jacob Schaub House is a historic home located in C. G. Hill Memorial Park at Pfafftown, Forsyth County, North Carolina. It was built in 1829–1830, and is a two-story, two bay by two bay, single pile brick dwelling. It features a Georgian style interior design and exterior end chimneys with stepped shoulders and decorative caps. It was built by John Jacob Schaub, a member of the Unitas Fratrum, or Moravian Church.

It was listed on the National Register of Historic Places in 1982.
