= John Wesley Snyder House =

Historic house in North Carolina, United States

- U.S. National Register of Historic Places
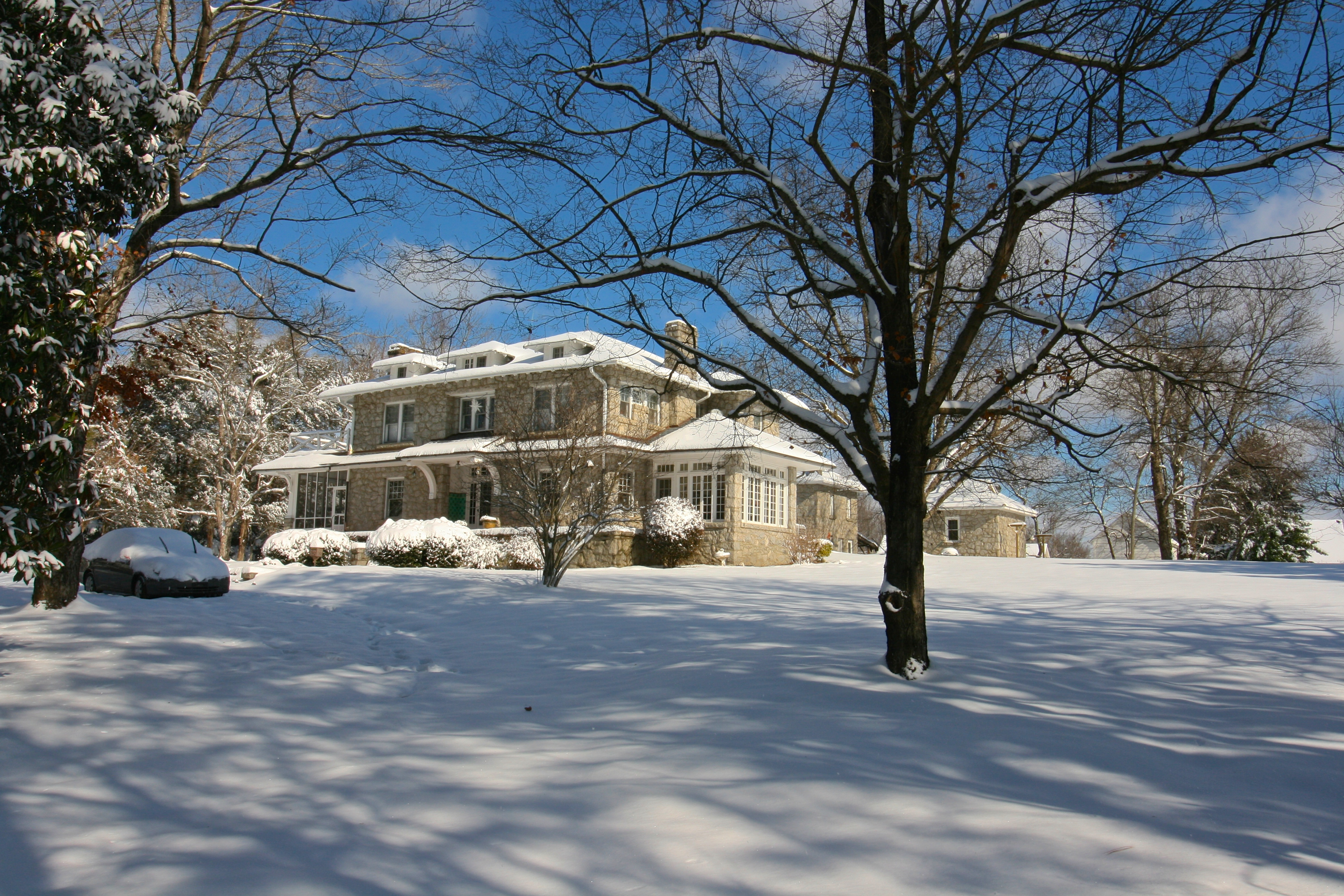

- Location within North Carolina Location within the United States
- Location: 2715 Old Salisbury Rd., near Winston-Salem, North Carolina
- Coordinates: 36°1′30″N 80°16′27″W
- Area: 2.2 acres (0.89 ha)
- Built: c. 1922, c. 1940
- Architectural style: Bungalow/craftsman, Colonial Revival
- NRHP reference No.: 00001209
- Added to NRHP: October 12, 2000

John Wesley Snyder House is a historic home located near Winston-Salem, Forsyth County, North Carolina. It was completed about 1922, and is a large two-story, three-bay, American Craftsman style granite dwelling. It features a low hipped roof pierced by three low hipped dormers, widely overhanging eaves, carved rafter ends, and projecting entrance bay supported by a pair of large, curved, wood brackets. It has a Colonial Revival / Craftsman interior. Construction materials were sourced from local quarries and forests. Also on the property are the contributing two-story granite carriage house/apartment (c.1922), granite smokehouse (c.1940), frame barn (c.1922), and frame pack house (c.1950).

It was listed on the National Register of Historic Places in 2000.
