= J. W. Paisley House =

Historic house in North Carolina, United States

- U.S. National Register of Historic Places
- Location within North Carolina Location within the United States
- Location: 934 Stadium Dr., Winston-Salem, North Carolina
- Coordinates: 36°5′24″N 80°13′38″W
- Area: less than one acre
- Built: 1910-1911
- MPS: Slater Industrial Academy Houses TR
- NRHP reference No.: 79001706
- Added to NRHP: July 22, 1979

J. W. Paisley House was a historic home located at Winston-Salem, Forsyth County, North Carolina. The house was built about 1910–1911, and was a large two-story, three-bay, frame dwelling. The house featured clipped gable roofs and dormers. It was built by John W. Paisley, faculty member of the Slater Industrial Academy for African-American students. The house has been demolished.

It was listed on the National Register of Historic Places in 1979.
