= W.C. Brown Apartment Building =

Demolished historic building in North Carolina, US

- U.S. National Register of Historic Places
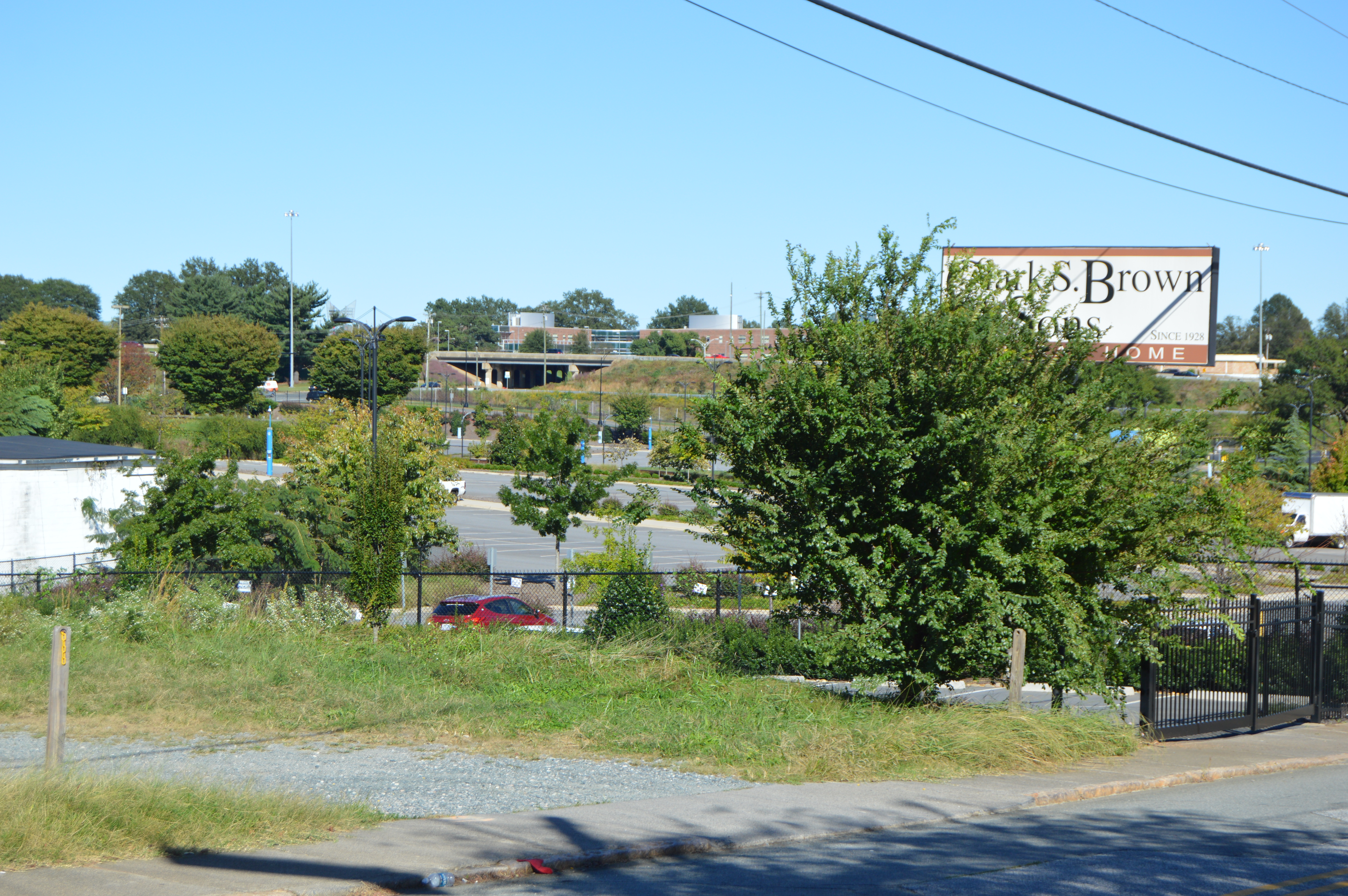
- Site overview

- Location within North Carolina Location within the United States
- Location: 311-317 E. 7th St., Winston-Salem, North Carolina
- Coordinates: 36°6′9″N 80°14′28″W
- Area: less than one acre
- Built: 1941
- Architectural style: Bungalow/craftsman
- MPS: African-American Neighborhoods in Northeastern Winston-Salem MPS
- NRHP reference No.: 98000725
- Added to NRHP: June 26, 1998

W.C. Brown Apartment Building was a historic apartment building located at Winston-Salem, Forsyth County, North Carolina. It was built about 1941, and was a two-story brick-veneered rectangular block structure. It had a hipped roof and exposed rafter ends in the Bungalow / American Craftsman style. The building was built as rental apartments for African-American families just before World War II. The building housed workers at the nearby R. J. Reynolds Tobacco Company. The building has been demolished.

It was listed on the National Register of Historic Places in 1998.
