= George Black House and Brickyard =

Historic house in North Carolina, United States

- U.S. National Register of Historic Places
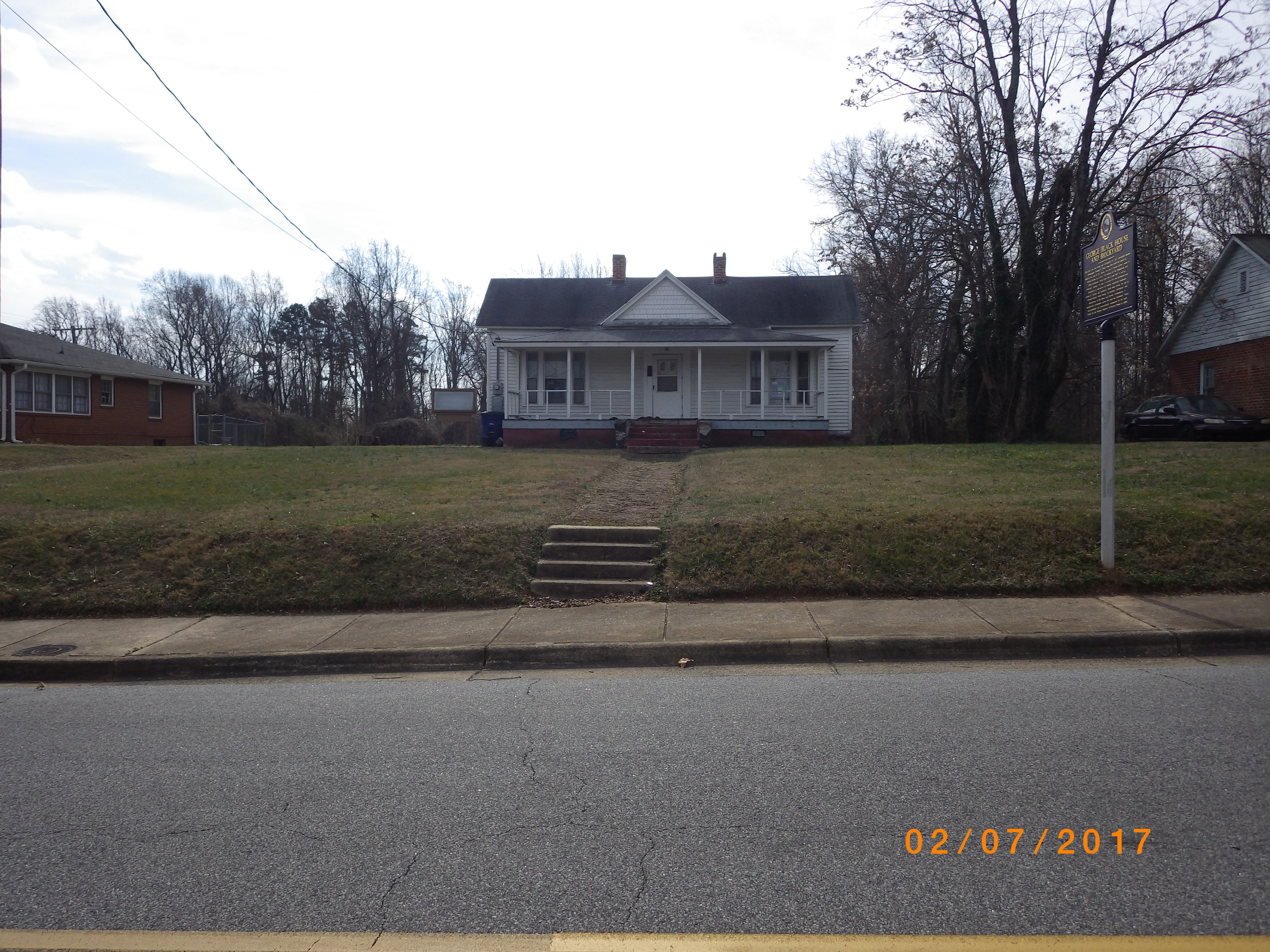

- Location within North Carolina Location within the United States
- Location: 111 Dellabrook Rd. Winston-Salem, North Carolina
- Coordinates: 36°6′48″N 80°12′35″W
- Area: less than one acre
- Built: c. 1900, c. 1940
- Built by: Black, George H. (brickyard)
- Architectural style: Triple-A
- NRHP reference No.: 99001683
- Added to NRHP: January 28, 2000

George Black House and Brickyard is a historic home and brickyard site located at Winston-Salem, Forsyth County, North Carolina. The house was built about 1900, and is a traditional one-story, three-bay, frame "triple-A" dwelling. The front facade features an almost full-width hip-roofed attached porch. Also on the property are the contributing remains of a brickmaking operation established about 1940. It was the home of African-American brickmaker George H. Black, who lived and worked on this property from 1934 until his death in 1980 at the age of 101. Black worked at Colonial Williamsburg in 1931 during the early years of restoration.

It was listed on the National Register of Historic Places in 2000.
