= Reynoldstown Historic District (Winston-Salem, North Carolina) =

Historic district in North Carolina, United States

- U.S. National Register of Historic Places
- U.S. Historic district
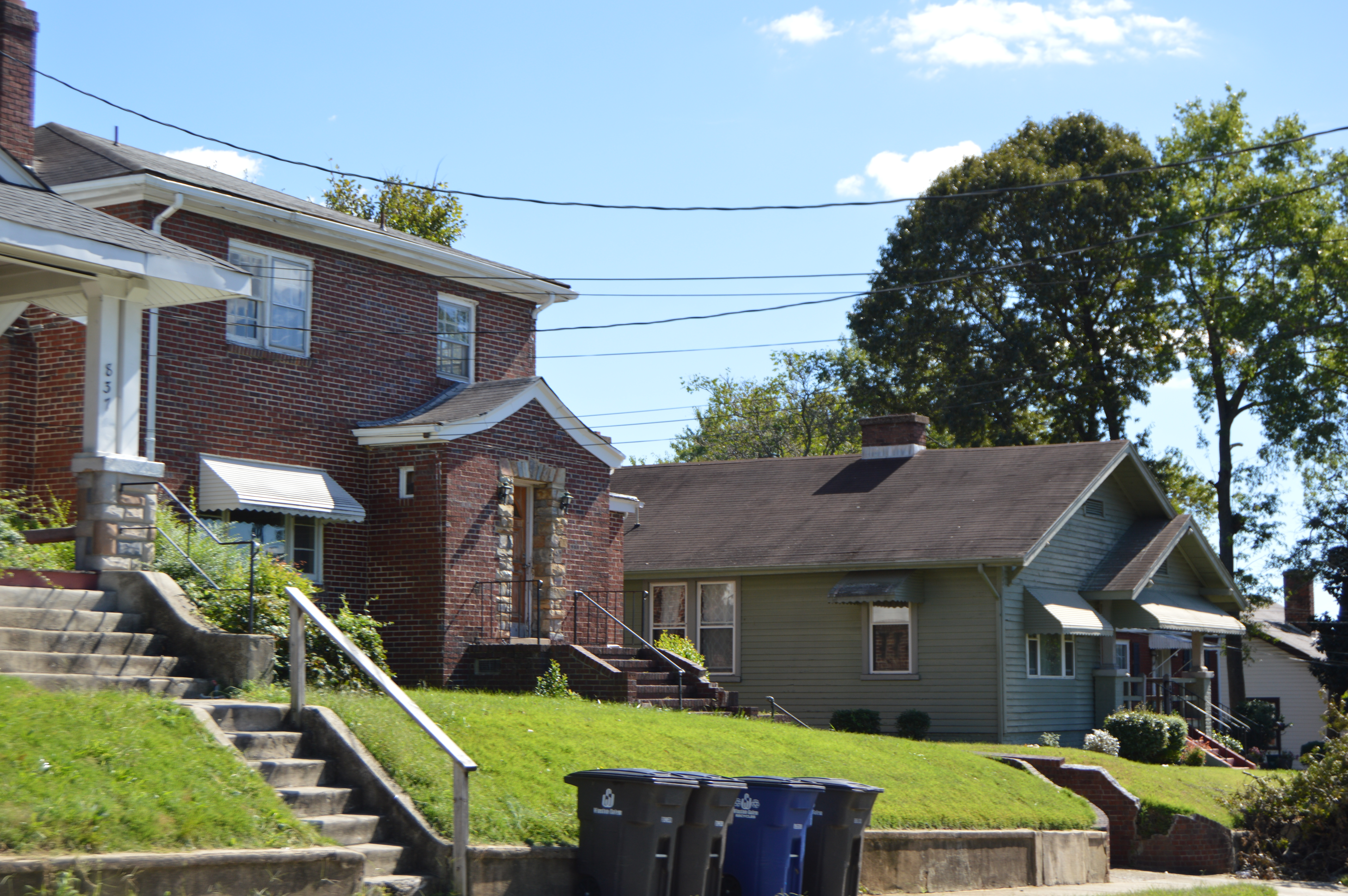
- Cameron Avenue

- Location within North Carolina Location within the United States
- Location: Portions of 800 & 900 blocks of Camel, Cameron, Graham, Jackson & Rich Aves., E. 10th St.& Cameron Ave Bridge, Winston-Salem, North Carolina
- Coordinates: 36°06′18″N 80°13′22″W
- Area: 41 acres (17 ha)
- Built: 1919
- Architectural style: Bungalow/craftsman, Tudor Revival, Colonial Revival
- NRHP reference No.: 08000111
- Added to NRHP: February 28, 2008

Reynoldstown Historic District, also known as Cameron Park, is a national historic district located at Winston-Salem, Forsyth County, North Carolina. The district encompasses 183 contributing buildings and 1 contributing structure (Cameron Avenue Bridge) in a planned residential development of the R. J. Reynolds Tobacco Company (RJR) and historically African-American residential section of Winston-Salem. The buildings date from about 1919 to 1949, and include notable examples of Colonial Revival, Tudor Revival, and Bungalow / American Craftsman style architecture.

It was listed on the National Register of Historic Places in 2008.
