= Carolinian and Piedmont =

Carolinian and Piedmont refers to two Amtrak services in North Carolina sponsored by NCDOT under the NC By Train brand:

- The Carolinian, a daily train between Charlotte, North Carolina and New York City
- The Piedmont, a thrice daily train between Charlotte and Raleigh, North Carolina
