= Justice House =

Justice House may refer to:

- Byron O. House (1902–1969), chief justice of the Illinois Supreme Court
- Charles S. House (1908–1996), associate justice of the Connecticut Supreme Court

== See also ==
- Universal House of Justice, the supreme governing institution of the Bahá'í Faith
- Roberts-Justice House, historic home located at Kernersville, Forsyth County, North Carolina
