= Kernersville station =

- Kernersville Depot
- U.S. National Register of Historic Places
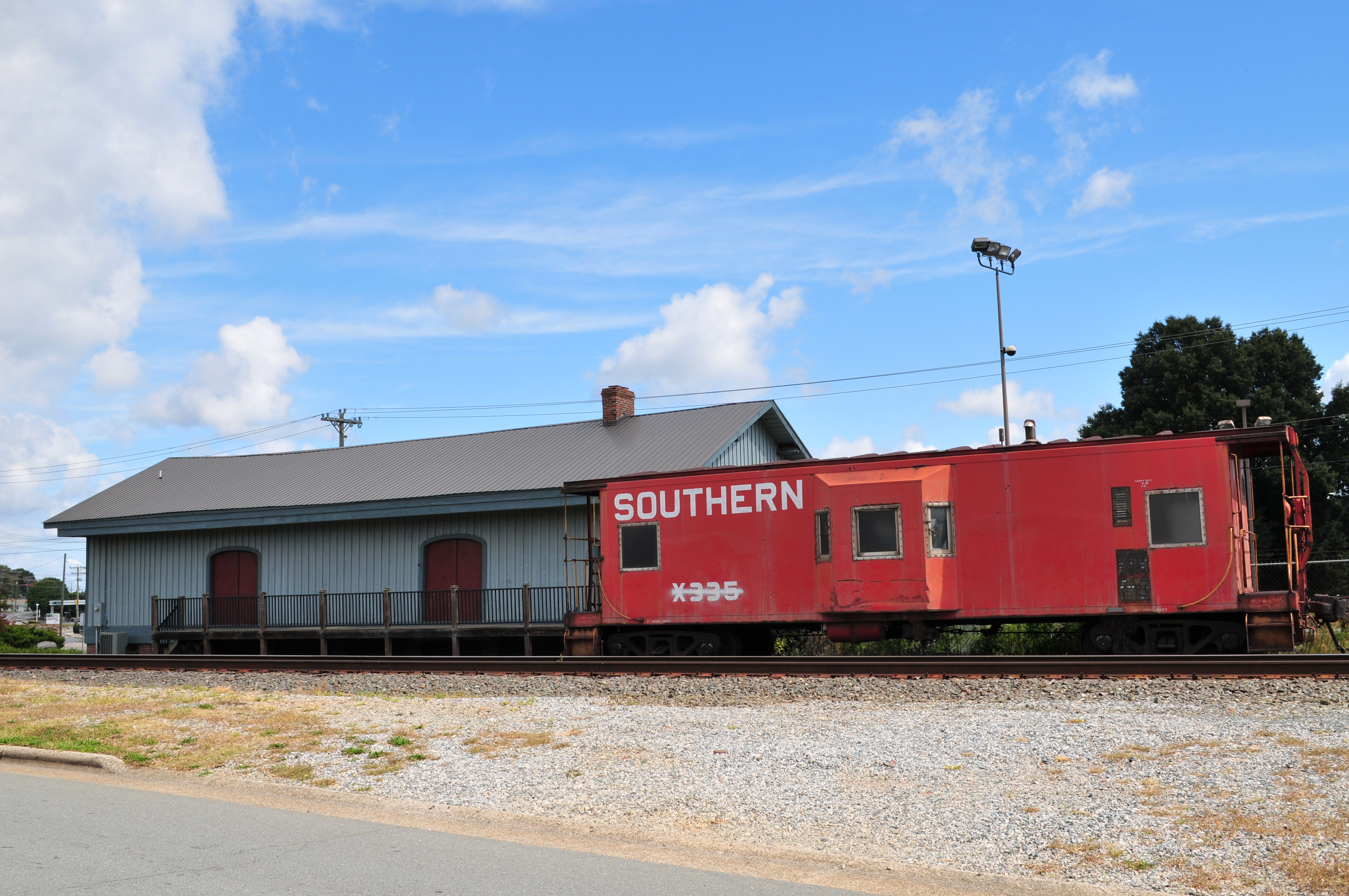
- Kernersville Depot, September 2013

- Location within North Carolina Location within the United States
- Location: 121 Railroad St., Kernersville, North Carolina
- Coordinates: 36°7′19″N 80°4′15″W
- Area: 1.2 acres (0.49 ha)
- Built: 1873
- Architectural style: Late Victorian
- MPS: Kernersville MPS
- NRHP reference No.: 88000133
- Added to NRHP: February 25, 1988

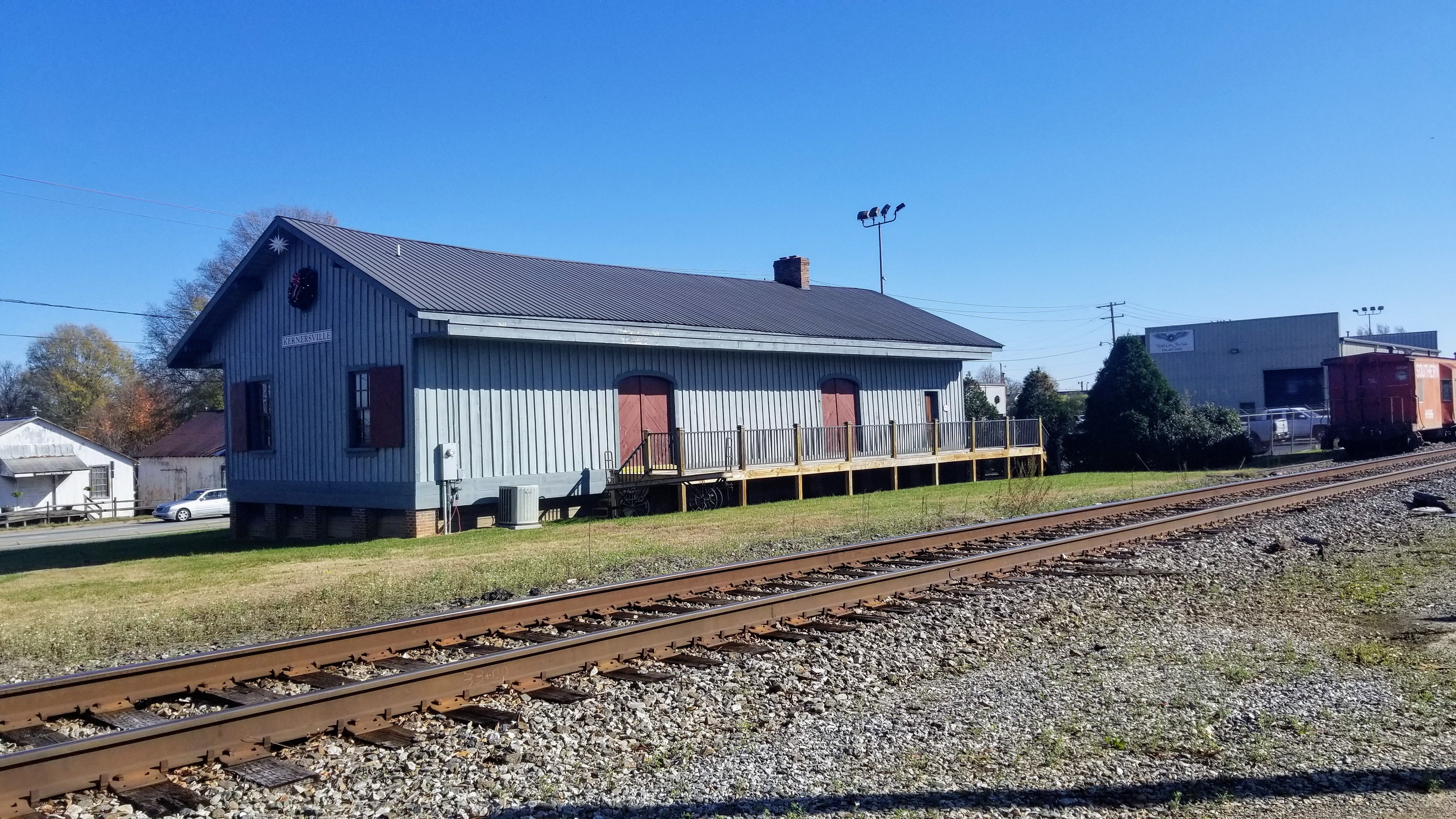
Kernersville Depot, 2020

Kernersville Depot is a historic train station located at Kernersville, Forsyth County, North Carolina. It was built by the Northwestern North Carolina Railroad in 1873. It is a plain one-story, mortise-and-tenon gable roofed building sheathed in board-and-batten siding in the Late Victorian style. It served as a depot until a new station was built in 1901. After that, it provided storage for the railroad and later for a farm and feed business.

It was listed on the National Register of Historic Places in 1988.

Preceding station	Southern Railway	Following station
Winston-Salem toward North Wilkesboro	North Wilkesboro – Morehead City	Friendship toward Morehead City
