= Stuart Motor Company =

Historic building in North Carolina, US

- U.S. National Register of Historic Places
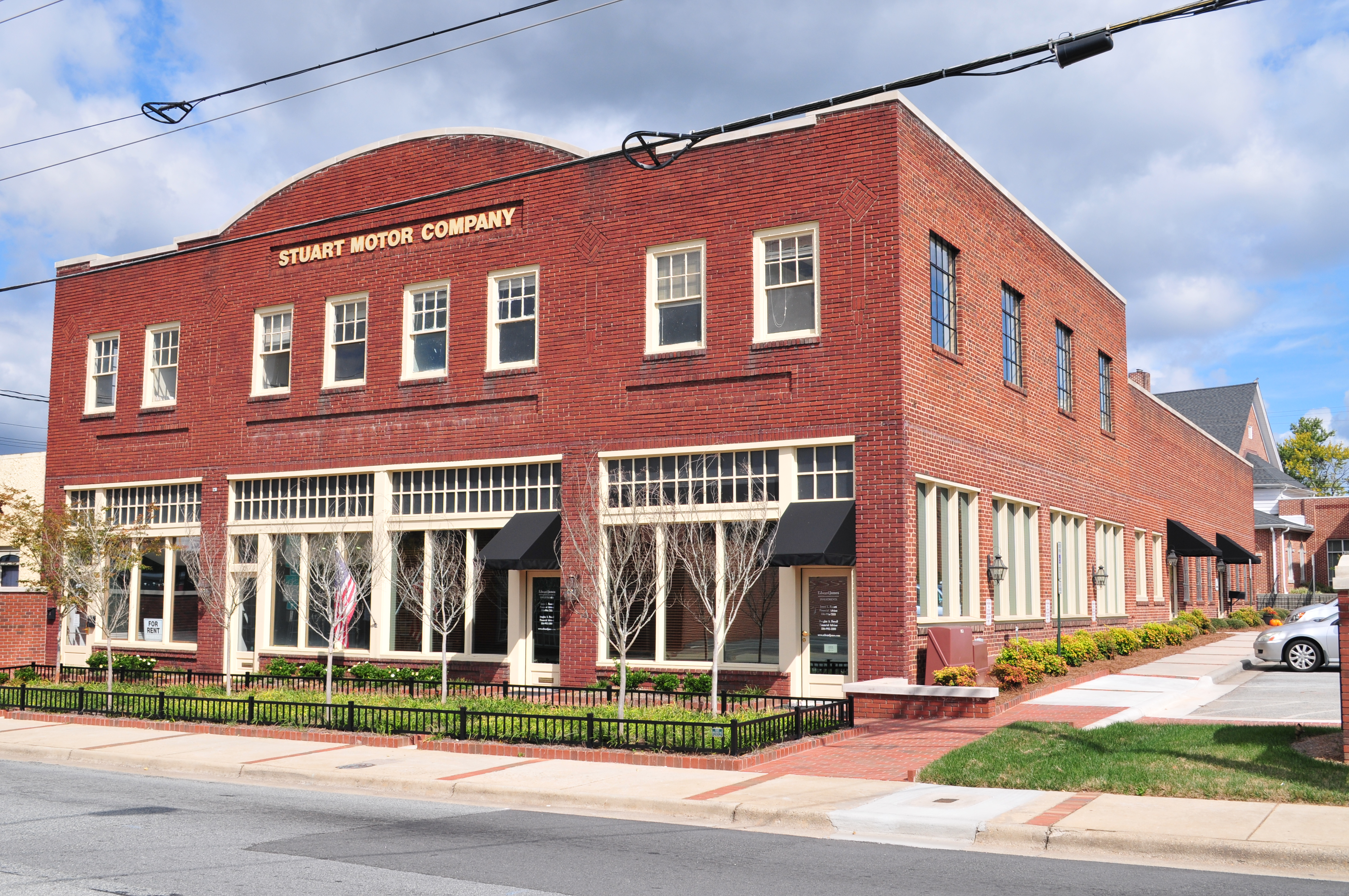
- Stuart Motor Company, September 2013

- Location within North Carolina Location within the United States
- Location: 109-111 E. Mountain St., Kernersville, North Carolina
- Coordinates: 36°7′11″N 80°4′22″W
- Area: less than one acre
- Built: 1926
- Architectural style: Commercial Style
- MPS: Kernersville MPS
- NRHP reference No.: 88000139
- Added to NRHP: February 25, 1988

Stuart Motor Company is a historic automobile showroom building located at Kernersville, Forsyth County, North Carolina. It was built in 1926, and is a utilitarian brick building with a two-story front section and a tall one-story rear section. The building previously featured "STUART MOTOR COMPANY" in Art Deco lettering.

It was listed on the National Register of Historic Places in 1988.
