= First Baptist Church (Kernersville, North Carolina) =

Historic church in North Carolina, United States

- U.S. National Register of Historic Places
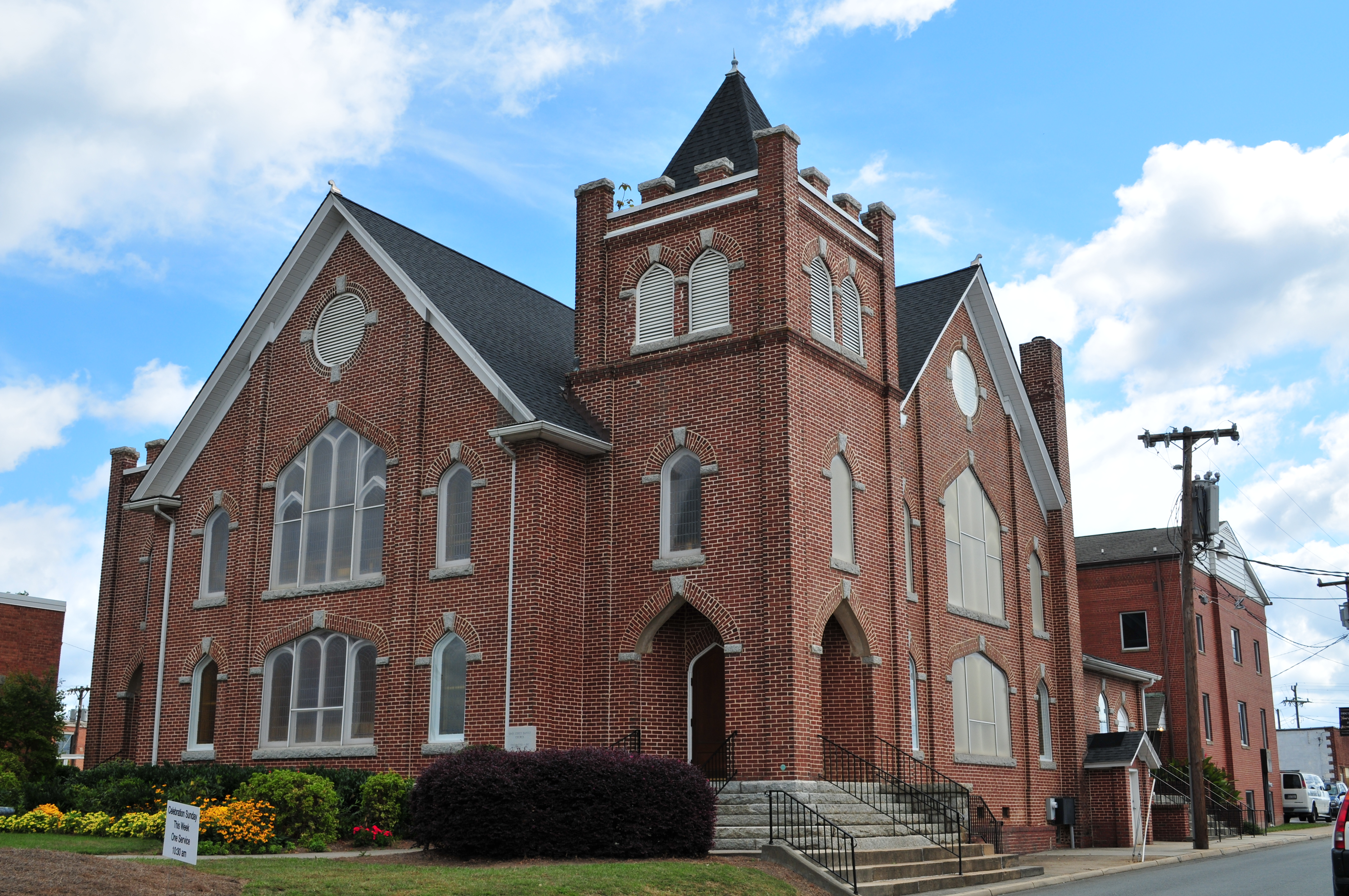
- Church in 2013

- Location within North Carolina Location within the United States
- Location: 126 N. Main St., Kernersville, North Carolina
- Coordinates: 36°7′13″N 80°4′21″W
- Area: less than one acre
- Built: 1915-1916
- Architectural style: Late Gothic Revival, Tudor Revival
- MPS: Kernersville MPS
- NRHP reference No.: 88000130
- Added to NRHP: February 25, 1988

First Baptist Church, is a historic Baptist church located at 401 Oakhurst Street in Kernersville, Forsyth County, North Carolina. It was built in 1915–1916, and is a two-story cross-gabled brick building, with Gothic Revival and Tudor Revival style design elements. It has a cross-gable roof, three-stage corner entrance tower, and retains original furnishings.

It was listed on the National Register of Historic Places in 1988.
