= Körner's Folly =

Historic house in North Carolina, United States

- U.S. National Register of Historic Places
- U.S. Historic district – Contributing property
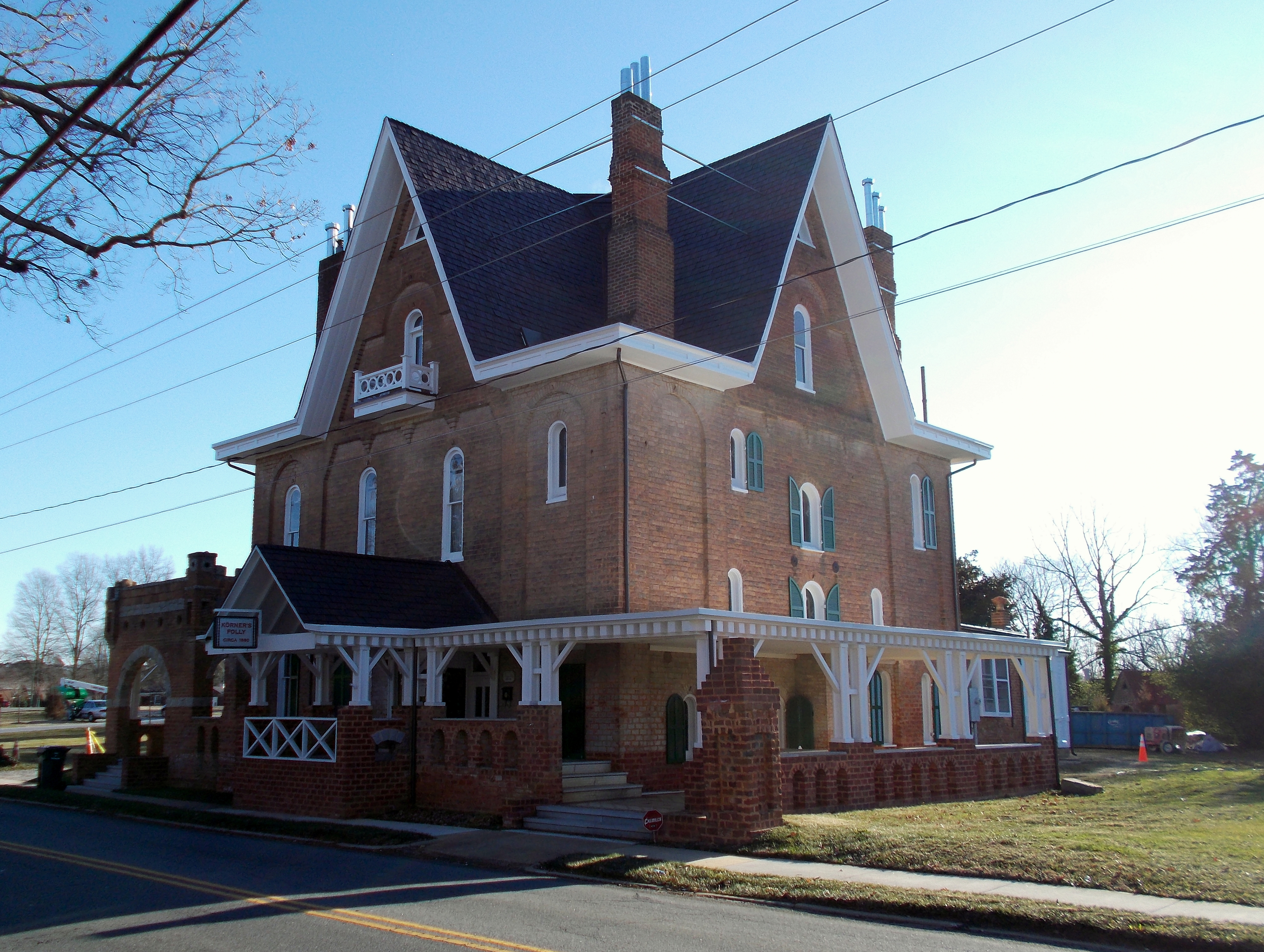
- Korner's Folly, January 2015

- Location within North Carolina Location within the United States
- Location: 413 S. Main St., Kernersville, North Carolina
- Coordinates: 36°6′55″N 80°4′44″W
- Area: 0.5 acres (0.20 ha)
- Built: 1880
- Built by: Jule Korner
- NRHP reference No.: 73001340
- Added to NRHP: March 20, 1973

Körner's Folly is a historic home located at Kernersville, Forsyth County, North Carolina, United States. It was built in 1880 by Jule Gilmer Körner, and is a 6,000 square foot, 3 1/2-story, eccentric brick dwelling with a shingled, cross-gable roof. It measures 48 feet on each side, with four bays. The house is said to have served originally as combination dwelling, stable, and carriage house, and featured an open carriageway running through the center of the house. Körner made his fortune by spearheading one of the first national advertising campaigns by painting murals of Bull Durham Smoking tobacco bulls on buildings and barns across the American east coast. In the 1870s he moved back to his hometown of Kernersville to build Körner's Folly and start an interior decorating and design business. After marrying Polly Alice Masten and having two children, Gilmer and Dore, Körner closed the carriageway and renovated the house to its present floor plan. The 22-room interior features unusual architecture and many examples of Victorian furniture and interior decoration since Körner used the house to showcase his business. Also on the property is a brick outbuilding – a small-scale version of the main house – which functioned as the "privy."

The third floor of Körner's Folly contains "Cupids Park," which the museum says is the oldest private theater in America. Jule and Polly Alice Korner built the theater as part of their "Juvenile Lyceum," which was a philanthropic project providing local children with access to the arts. Today, the theater is used by local theatrical groups and by the Körner's Folly Foundation for a puppet show, which is performed several times a year for children and visiting school groups.

The 22-room mansion is now a historic house museum that is owned and operated by the Körner's Folly Foundation, a 501(c)3 nonprofit organization. Visitors can view original furnishings and artwork, 15 fireplaces, cast-plaster details, carved woodwork, and elaborate hand-laid tiles. The house is open to the public for self-guided tours Tuesday - Saturday, 10 am - 4 pm, with the last entry time at 3 pm.

It was listed on the National Register of Historic Places in 1973. It is located in the South Main Street Historic District.

== Gallery ==
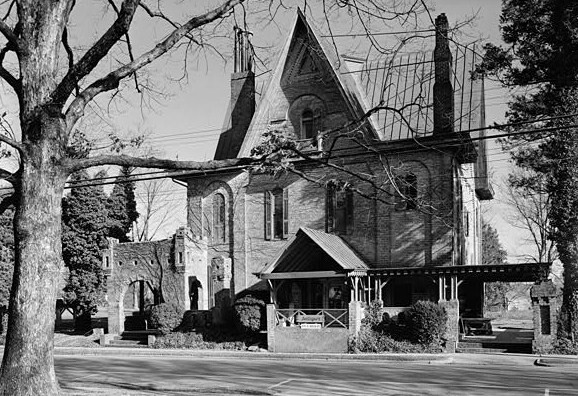
Körner's Folly, HABS Photo

Körner's Folly, side view
