= NC By Train =

State supported train in North Carolina, US

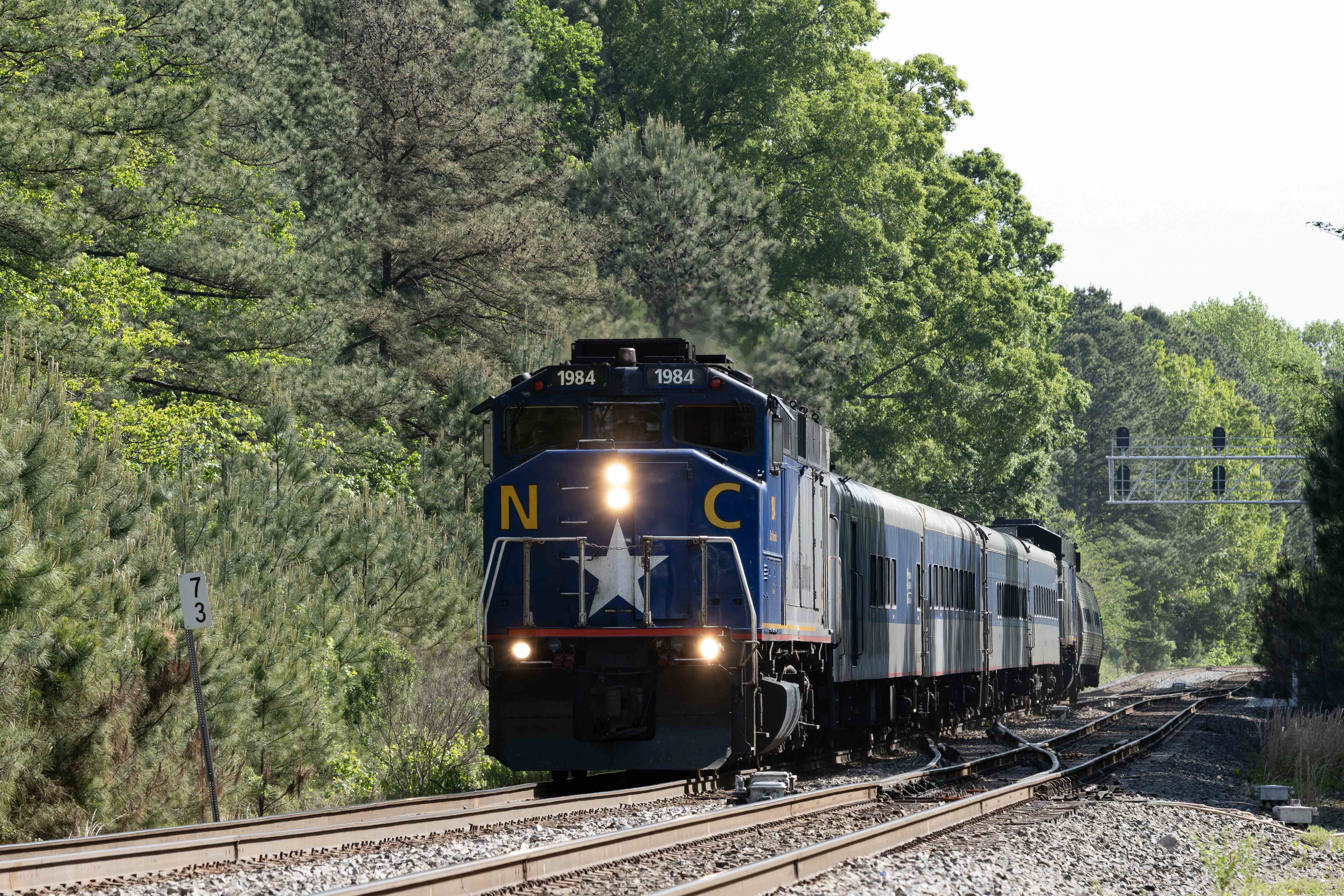
- A Piedmont train in Cary, North Carolina, 2025

Overview
- Owner: NCDOT Rail Division
- Locale: North Carolina
- Transit type: Inter-city rail
- Number of lines: 2
- Annual ridership: 737,879 (FY 25) ▲4.2% (Note: Amtrak's Fiscal Year (FY) runs from October 1 of the prior year to September 30 of the named year.)
- Headquarters: Raleigh, North Carolina
- Website: www.ncbytrain.org

Operation
- Began operation: 1984; 42 years ago
- Operator: Amtrak

NC By Train is a brand name used by the Rail Division of the North Carolina Department of Transportation (NCDOT) for two state-supported Amtrak routes operating in the U.S. state of North Carolina–the Carolinian and the Piedmont.

== History ==
Amtrak (in full, the National Railroad Passenger Corporation) took over most intercity rail service in the United States in 1971. At the outset, service through North Carolina was mostly limited to long-distance routes that were not well-suited for regional travel. This remained unchanged when Southern Railway, one of the larger railroads that initially opted to keep its passenger services, handed its routes to Amtrak in 1979.

By 1984, Amtrak service in North Carolina was limited to four trains: the New Orleans–New York Crescent, which passed through Charlotte and the Piedmont Triad; the New York–Miami Silver Meteor and New York–Savannah Palmetto, which both passed through the Sandhills; and the New York–Miami Silver Star, which passed through Raleigh. The only daylight service came from the Palmetto and northbound Silver Star.

In that year, Governor Jim Hunt created a Public Transportation Division within NCDOT. Partly due to Hunt's efforts, Amtrak introduced the Carolinian on October 28, 1984, as a Charlotte-New York service, supported with a yearly $436,000 state subsidy. It operated as a section of the Palmetto, running from Charlotte through Greensboro and Raleigh along the state-owned North Carolina Railroad before joining the Palmetto at Richmond, Virginia for the journey to New York. It was the first direct service between Charlotte and Raleigh in 30 years (or 50 years, depending on the source), and the first North Carolina-focused service in 20 years.

Amtrak intended the Carolinian to be a one-year pilot project, and strongly considered making it a permanent fixture in its schedule. However, due to poor marketing, many passengers did not know that the train offered much of the state a one-seat ride to New York. As a result, while ridership far exceeded projections, the Carolinian lost over $800,000 as most passengers opted to travel within North Carolina and not continue north of the Virginia border. When North Carolina declined to increase its subsidy, Amtrak withdrew the Carolinian on September 3, 1985.

Hunt's successor, Jim Martin, was also committed to the development of passenger rail. He created a Passenger Rail Task Force that recommended preserving rail corridors for both freight and passengers. It also recommended additional passenger service along the I-85 Corridor from Charlotte to Raleigh. In 1990, Amtrak and the state introduced a second incarnation of the Carolinian. It ran along the same route as its 1984-85 predecessor, but joined the Palmetto at Rocky Mount. This incarnation was successful enough that within a year, Amtrak not only made the Carolinian permanent, but made it a full-fledged day train running independently from Charlotte to New York.

Building on this success, NCDOT formed a Rail Unit, which was expanded to a full-fledged division in 1995. During this time, state officials pressed for additional service along the fast-growing I-85 Corridor. However, Amtrak initially balked, claiming that it did not have enough rolling stock to spare. NCDOT decided to buy its own equipment. In the fall of 1990, NCDOT bought five repurposed coaches and leased two locomotives for the planned Charlotte-Raleigh service, named the Piedmont, which began service on May 25, 1995. It would have begun service sooner, but Norfolk Southern Railway, which operates the North Carolina Railroad under a longstanding lease with the state, insisted that the state build a wye in Charlotte to turn the trains around. Previously, the southbound Carolinian had to make a time-consuming 10-mile (16 km) deadhead trip to the nearest wye in Pineville, North Carolina. A second round trip was added in 2010, followed by a third in 2018. A fourth was planned for 2021, but COVID-19 issues pushed it back to 2023.

== Marketing and operations ==
Unlike many states that subsidize Amtrak routes within their borders, North Carolina handles much of the marketing and operations for its state-subsidized services itself. It continued to distribute printed timetables for the Carolinian and Piedmont after Amtrak discontinued printed timetables. It operates a toll-free information line, 800-BY-TRAIN, which is staffed by North Carolinians. NCDOT also sets the schedules for the Piedmont and owns the equipment, though it is operated by Amtrak train crews.

== Routes ==
=== Carolinian ===
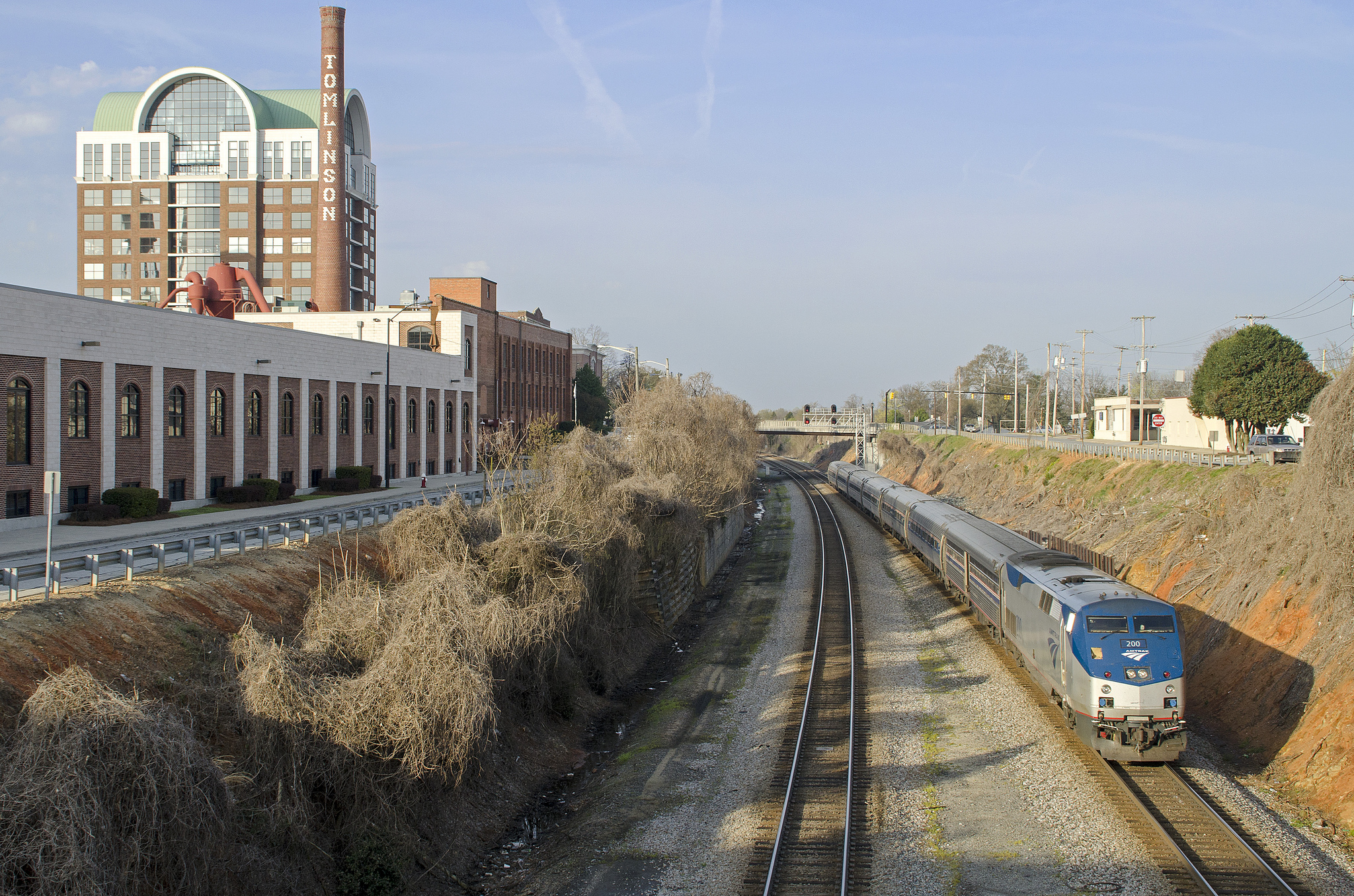
The northbound Carolinian pulling into High Point

The Carolinian, operating since 1990 and in its current form since 1991, is a 704 mi (1,133 km) route from Charlotte to New York, running once daily in each direction. It serves Charlotte, Kannapolis, Salisbury, High Point, Greensboro, Burlington, Durham, Cary, Raleigh, Selma, Wilson and Rocky Mount before continuing to the Northeast Corridor via Richmond. Seasonally, it also serves the North Carolina State Fair and Lexington Barbecue Festival. North Carolina subsidizes the train from Charlotte to the Virginia border.

It is augmented by three Amtrak Thruway routes, two connecting Wilson to large swaths of eastern North Carolina and one connecting Winston-Salem and High Point.

Volunteers from the North Carolina Train Host Association are on hand between Charlotte and Selma to provide information about points of interest in North Carolina. Station hosts are also on hand at the state's three busiest stations–Charlotte, Greensboro and Raleigh.

The Kannapolis, Salisbury, High Point, Burlington and Selma stations are served by NC Station Attendants who meet all trains and answer travel questions. The other stations along the route are staffed with Amtrak personnel with full ticketing and baggage service.

=== Piedmont ===
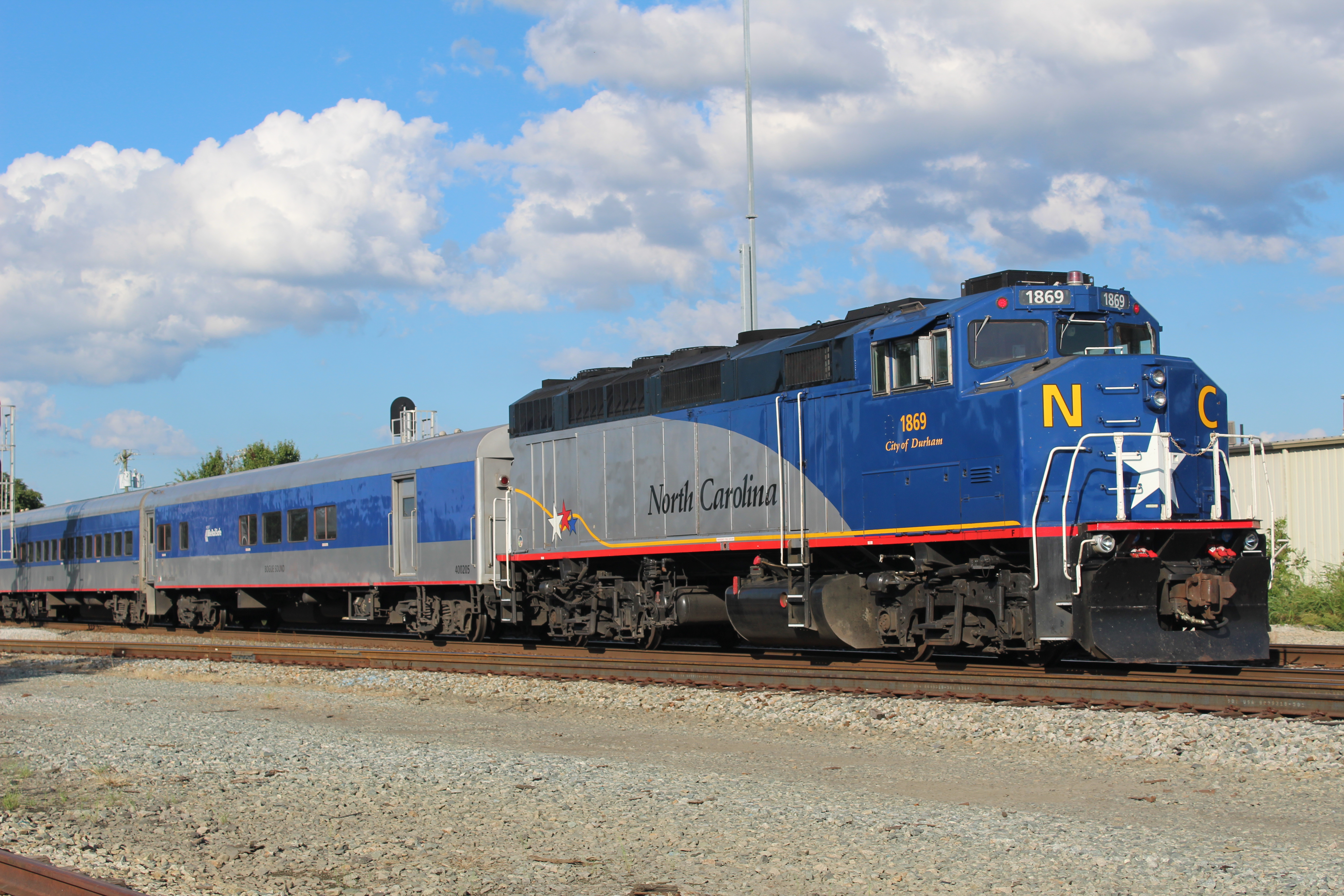
NCDOT F59PH locomotive 1869 City of Durham leads the Piedmont at Salisbury in August 2016

The Piedmont, operating since 1995, is a 173 mi (278 km) route from Charlotte to Raleigh with four daily round trips. It travels along the far southern leg of the Carolinian route, largely paralleling Interstate 85. While the Carolinian uses Amtrak rolling stock painted in Amtrak's national red-white-blue scheme, the Piedmont uses state-owned locomotives and coaches painted in a blue-silver-red palette echoing the North Carolina state flag. Its introduction enabled same-day business travel between Charlotte and Raleigh.

== Proposed expansion ==
=== Corridor Identification Program routes ===
In May 2023, the NCDOT Rail Division submitted twelve routes to the Federal Railroad Administration's Corridor Identification and Development Program, a mechanism for developing new train routes under the Infrastructure Investment and Jobs Act. In December 2023, seven of these routes were accepted into the program:

- Asheville to Salisbury
- Charlotte to Washington, D.C. (SEC: Norlina Subdivision realignment of the existing Carolinian)
- Charlotte to Atlanta, Georgia (SEC: Greenfield alternative)
- Charlotte to Kings Mountain
- Raleigh to Fayetteville
- Raleigh to Wilmington
- Raleigh to Winston-Salem

Each of these corridors are granted $500,000 toward engineering and feasibility studies and are prioritized for future federal funding.

==== Asheville–Salisbury ====
Western North Carolina had been served by passenger trains following the construction of the Western North Carolina Railroad in the 1850s. Service was inherited by the Southern Railway in 1894, and discontinued in August 1975.

In January 1997, NCDOT's Rail Division first studied the possibility of restoring service to the region. Based on projected costs, revenue, and ridership, the best option was determined to be a route between Salisbury and Asheville along 139 miles (224 km) of Norfolk Southern's S-Line. Intermediate stations would be located in Statesville, Hickory, Morganton, Marion, Old Fort, and Black Mountain. Passengers could transfer to the Piedmont or Carolinian at Salisbury station. In 1999, local stakeholders formed the Western North Carolina Rail Corridor Committee to promote enactment of the route. In March 2001, NCDOT published an updated study with a timetable of phases for the project, along with a cost estimate for each phase. During the first phase, Amtrak would trial the route with Amtrak Thruway service along US 70 to Asheville, the region's first connection of any sort to the national rail system in the Amtrak era. The report also recommended an additional station in Valdese. In April 2002, an NCDOT report proposed a schedule of two daily round trips on the route: one morning and one evening departure in each direction. The report estimated that the station, track, signal, and bridge projects required to start the route would cost $134.7 million (2002 US dollars).

In August 2015, the Comprehensive State Rail Plan continued to recommend the rail route with an interim Thruway Bus service. The plan estimated a cost of $405.3 million (2014 US dollars) and ridership of 24,000 in the first year. Noting the age of the original studies, NCDOT prescribes an updated study. In March 2021, Amtrak included the route in its "Amtrak Connects Us" 15-year expansion vision ahead of the Biden administration's push to pass the American Jobs Plan. In December 2023, an updated feasibility study was completed by NCDOT, which estimated the cost at $665 million (2023 US dollars). The study assumed three round trips per day, with conceptional travel times of 3 hours and 25 minutes to 3 hours and 48 minutes, ridership modeling of up to 100,000 annual local trips by 2045, and ridership modeling of up to 290,000 additional Western North Carolina trips from connections via the Carolinian and Piedmont trains. In the appendix, Norfolk Southern noted that they cannot validate the various conclusion in the report, but does support the expansion of passenger rail and looks forward in those discussions. Also, that same month, the Federal Railroad Administration selected the Asheville–Salisbury route as part of the Corridor Identification and Development Program. It was granted up to $500,000 toward engineering and feasibility studies and is prioritized for future federal funding.

==== Charlotte–Washington, DC ====
The proposed corridor would provide improvements to the existing state-supported Carolinian service between Charlotte and Washington, D.C. (with existing service continuing north to New York City), by improving/adding services in Greensboro, Winston-Salem, High Point, Raleigh, Durham, Salisbury, and Burlington, North Carolina, and Petersburg, Richmond, Fredericksburg, and Alexandria, Virginia, by addressing infrastructure capacity constraints. Improvements include constructing/rehabilitating a partially abandoned alignment (the Norlina Subdivision) between Raleigh and Petersburg, that is more direct than the existing routing through Rocky Mount, potentially shaving more than an hour off the end-to-end travel time.

==== Charlotte–Atlanta, Georgia ====
The proposed route would provide new service on a new high-speed rail alignment between Charlotte and Atlanta, Georgia, with potential intermediate stops including Greenville–Spartanburg International Airport, and Athens, Georgia, then serving a downtown Atlanta station and terminating at Hartsfield–Jackson Atlanta International Airport.

==== Charlotte–Kings Mountain ====
The proposed corridor would connect Kings Mountain to Charlotte. The proposed corridor would provide new service on existing alignment with capacity improvements west of the Charlotte Gateway Station and likely extending service to Kings Mountain, in addition to track, crossover, or signal improvements.

==== Raleigh–Fayetteville ====
The proposed corridor would provide a new service connecting Fayetteville with Raleigh, with intermediate stops at Lillington and Fuquay-Varina, using an existing alignment.

==== Raleigh–Wilmington ====
In May 2001, NCDOT's Southeastern North Carolina Passenger Rail Feasibility Study showed strong interest in trains from Raleigh to Wilmington. A July 2005 study recommended that two new routes be added to the State Rail Plan. Both routes would start by following the Carolinian and Silver Star corridor from Raleigh to Selma.

- The "Goldsboro route" would continue southeast from Selma to Goldsboro, then head south to Wilmington with potential stops in Mount Olive, Warsaw, Wallace, Burgaw, and Castle Hayne. This route is the most direct but would require rebuilding 27 miles (43 km) of track and six rail bridges.
- The "Fayetteville route" would follow the Palmetto and Silver Meteor corridor southwest from Selma through Fayetteville, then at a new station in Pembroke, branch southeast to Wilmington with potential stops in Lumberton, Bladenboro, Acme/Riegelwood, and Navassa.

In the 2015 State Rail Plan, it continued to recommend both routes, listing the estimated cost of the Goldsboro route at $262.5 million (2014 US dollars) and its first-year ridership at 29,000, though the plan also requests new studies to update these figures. In March 2021, Amtrak included the Goldsboro route to Wilmington in its "Amtrak Connects Us" 15-year expansion vision. In December 2023, the Federal Railroad Administration selected the Raleigh–Wilmington route, via Goldsboro, as part of the Corridor Identification and Development Program. It was granted up to $500,000 toward engineering and feasibility studies and is prioritized for future federal funding.

==== Raleigh–Winston-Salem ====
The proposed corridor would connect Winston-Salem with Raleigh, with intermediate stops at Greensboro, Burlington, Durham, and Cary, complementing the existing state-supported Piedmont and Carolinian services. The proposed corridor would also include new frequencies, improvements to reliability, and new stations. Winston-Salem's restored Union Station would serve as the western terminus. Presently, Winston-Salem is only served by an Amtrak Thruway bus to High Point.

=== Other proposed routes ===
==== Charlotte–Lynchburg, Virginia ====
Service between Charlotte and Lynchburg, Virginia, is currently provided once daily by the long-distance Crescent. NCDOT is performing a preliminary evaluation for additional service, which may be achieved by extending a Northeast Regional round trip to Charlotte. The cost has been estimated at $35.6 million (2014 US dollars).

==== Raleigh–Greenville ====
The proposed route between Raleigh and Greenville would travel along the Carolina Coastal Railway tracks, connecting with the Palmetto and Silver Service at Wilson station. In July 2022, planners from NCDOT and Pitt County announced they would hire a contractor to conduct a feasibility study of the route after receiving a $250,000 federal grant. The study is expected to take 18 months. Supporters of the study include Greenville Mayor P.J. Connelly, East Carolina University Chancellor Philip Rogers, State Representative Brian Farkas, and the head of the Pitt-Greenville Convention & Visitors Authority. In March 2023, NCDOT submitted the route to the Federal Railroad Administration's Corridor Identification and Development Program; but was not selected when the results were released in December of that same year.

==== Raleigh–Hampton Roads, Virginia ====
In August 2015, NCDOT had suggested studying a service between Raleigh and Hampton Roads, Virginia's second-largest metropolitan area, home to Virginia Beach and Norfolk. The proposed route would require reconstruction of a disused Raleigh and Gaston Railroad line between Norlina and Roanoke Rapids.

==== Raleigh–Morehead City ====
The proposed route between Raleigh and Morehead City, via Selma Union Depot, would travel along the existing North Carolina Railroad track, with intermediate stops in Goldsboro, Kinston, and New Bern. In March 2023, NCDOT submitted the route to the Federal Railroad Administration's Corridor Identification and Development Program; but was not selected when the results were released in December of that same year.

==== Raleigh–Hamlet ====
The proposed route between Raleigh and Hamlet, would complement the existing Silver Star (now temporarily the Floridian), with intermediate stops in Cary, Sanford, and Southern Pines. March 2023, NCDOT submitted the route to the Federal Railroad Administration's Corridor Identification and Development Program; but was not selected when the results were released in December of that same year.

==== Raleigh–Weldon ====
The proposed route between Raleigh and Weldon, would complement the existing Carolinian, with intermediate stops in Selma, Wilson, and Rocky Mount. March 2023, NCDOT submitted the route to the Federal Railroad Administration's Corridor Identification and Development Program; but was not selected when the results were released in December of that same year.

==== Winston-Salem–Charlotte ====
The proposed corridor would connect Winston-Salem with Charlotte, by following the existent O-Line. Winston-Salem's restored Union Station would serve as the northern terminus. March 2023, NCDOT submitted the route to the Federal Railroad Administration's Corridor Identification and Development Program; but was not selected when the results were released in December of that same year.
