= Union Station (Winston-Salem, North Carolina) =

Historic building in North Carolina, US

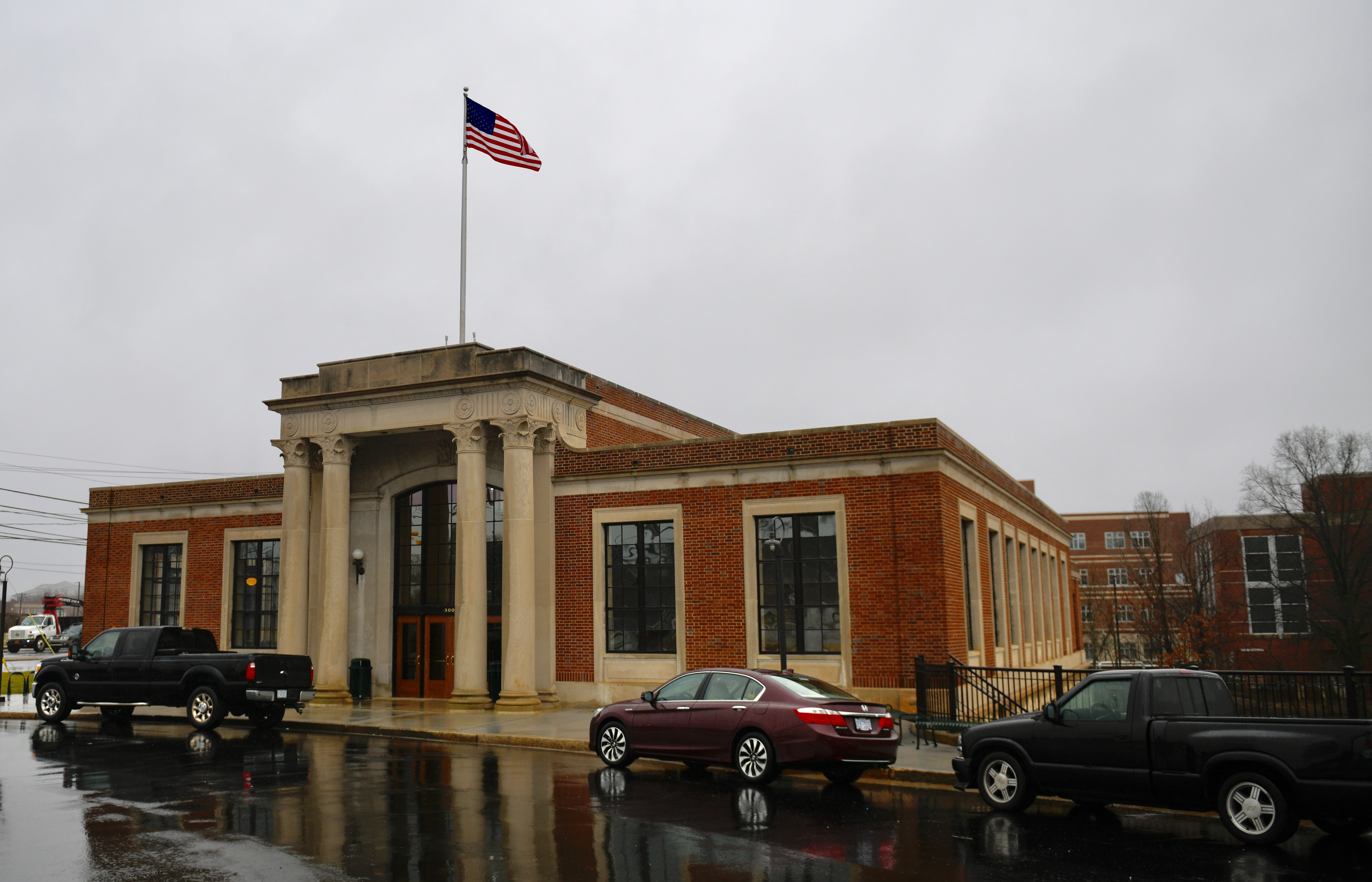

General information
- Location: 300 Martin Luther King, Jr., Dr. Winston-Salem, North Carolina; United States
- Coordinates: 36°5′36″N 80°13′42″W
- Owner: City of Winston-Salem
- Transit authority: Winston-Salem Transit Authority
- Line: K-line
- Tracks: 1 (no passenger service)
- Bus routes: 5
- Bus operators: WSTA; PART
- Connections: Amtrak Thruway

Construction
- Structure type: At-grade
- Accessible: Yes
- Architect: Fellhimer & Wagner; et.al.
- Architectural style: Beaux Arts

Other information
- Status: Unstaffed
- Station code: Amtrak: UWS
- Website: Union Station

History
- Opened: 1926
- Closed: 15 June 1970
- Rebuilt: 2018-2019
- Former names: Davis Garage
- Original company: Winston-Salem Terminal Company
Former services
Preceding station	Norfolk and Western Railway	Following station
Terminus	Winston-Salem – Roanoke	Walkertown toward Roanoke
Preceding station	Southern Railway	Following station
Bethania toward North Wilkesboro	North Wilkesboro – Morehead City	Kernersville toward Morehead City
Haynes toward Mooresville Junction	Mooresville Junction – Winston-Salem	Terminus

U.S. National Register of Historic Places
- Official name: Union Station
- Designated: December 24, 1998
- Reference no.: 98001547
- Architectural style: Beaux Arts
Location

Union Station is a historic train station, currently serving as a bus station, located in Winston-Salem, Forsyth County, North Carolina.

== History ==
The station was built to service the Southern, Norfolk and Western and Winston-Salem Southbound Railways. It was designed by Fellhimer & Wagner and built between 1924 and 1926. It is a one to three story, banked Beaux-Arts style steel frame building faced with brick and limestone. It consists of a rectangular main body, five bays wide and eight bays deep, with a large square east wing. The front facade features a limestone portico supported by paired heroic columns with stylized Corinthian order capitals. Brickwork on the main level is laid in Flemish bond. Surrounding the building are some surviving original landscape features. The station served as the city's sole passenger train station between 1926 and 1970.

The station was sold to Harvey Davis in 1975, and he converted the building into an automobile repair business called Davis Garage.

It was listed on the National Register of Historic Places in 1998.

Winston-Salem acquired the building in 2012 through eminent-domain, with a long term goal of reestablishing passenger train service to the city. In 2018 the city hired Walter Robbs Callahan & Pierce Architects and New Atlantic Contracting to restore the station, and it had a grand reopening on September 7, 2019.

== Services ==
Union Station currently serves as a secondary bus hub for the Winston-Salem Transit Authority, after the Clark Campbell Transportation Center.

PART's Route 1 stops at the station, and in conjunction with PART's Route 3, serves as an Amtrak Thruway connector to High Point station.

On December 8, 2023, the Federal Railroad Administration included an Amtrak route connecting Winston-Salem to Raleigh into the Corridor Identification and Development Program. The proposed route would include intermediate stops at Greensboro, Burlington, Durham, and Cary, complementing the existing state-supported Piedmont and Carolinian services. The North Carolina Department of Transportation was granted $500,000 toward engineering and feasibility studies for the route.

== Station layout ==
The station has three levels, with the highest level at-grade with Martin Luther King, Jr. Drive and the lowest level along Norfolk Southern Railway's K-Line.

The street level, historically known as the concourse level, has the station's waiting room. The middle level is unoccupied, and the city intends on leasing out the space. The City of Winston-Salem Department of Transportation offices and Traffic Management Center occupies the station's lowest floor.
