= Kernersville, North Carolina =

- Town
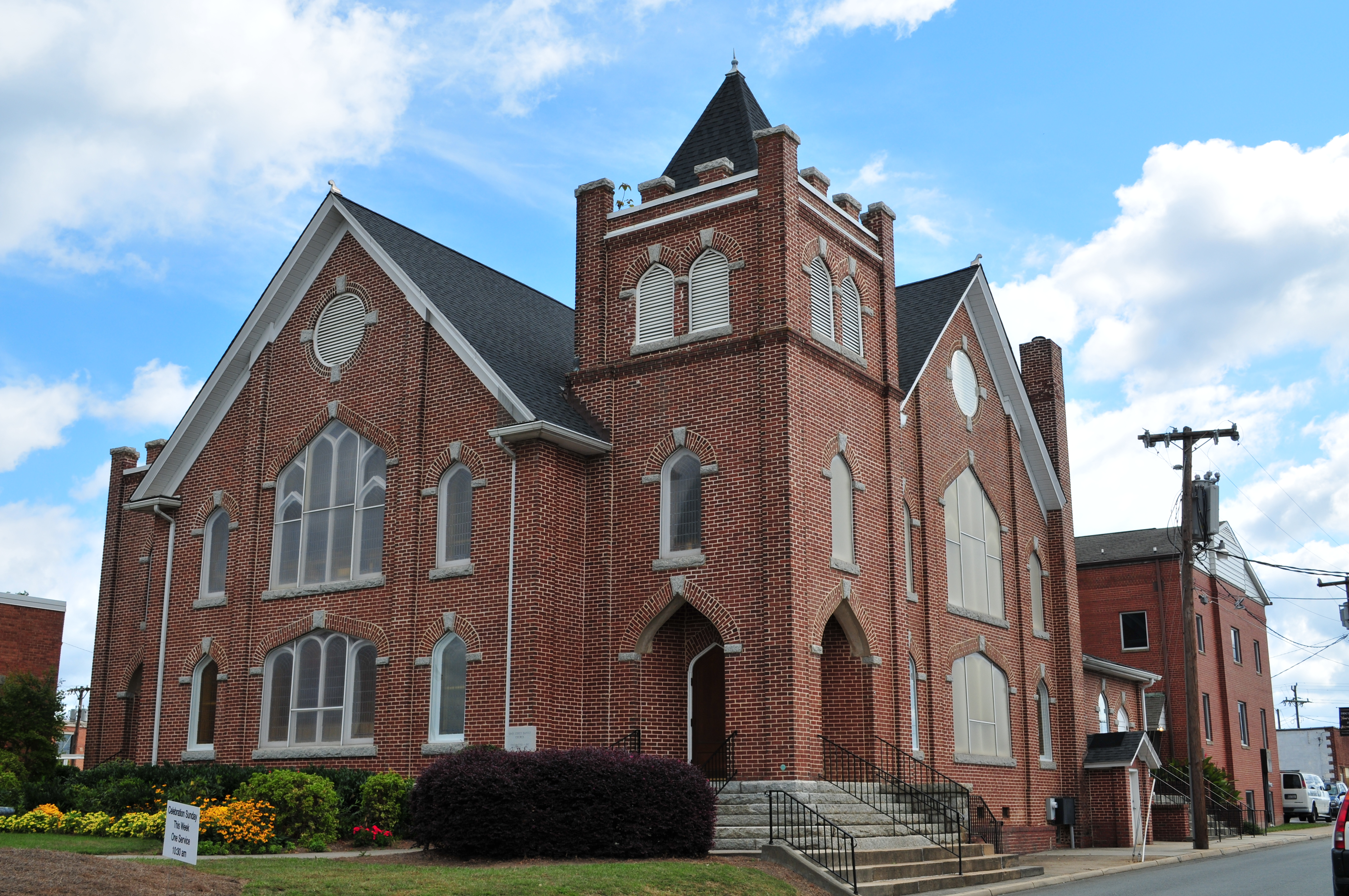
- Motto: "The Heart of the Triad"
- Location in Forsyth County and the state of North Carolina
- Coordinates: 36°06′22″N 80°05′03″W
- Country: United States
- State: North Carolina
- Counties: Forsyth, Guilford
- Founded: 1756
- Incorporated: 1873
- Named for: Joseph Kerner

Government
  - Mayor: Dawn H. Morgan

Area
  - Total: 18.22 sq mi (47.18 km^{2})
  - Land: 18.10 sq mi (46.88 km^{2})
  - Water: 0.11 sq mi (0.29 km^{2})
- Elevation: 938 ft (286 m)

Population (2020)
  - Total: 26,449
  - Estimate (2024): 28,760
  - Density: 1,461.2/sq mi (564.16/km^{2})
- Time zone: UTC-5 (Eastern (EST))
  - Summer (DST): UTC-4 (EDT)
- ZIP codes: 27284–27285
- Area code: 336
- FIPS code: 37-35600
- GNIS feature ID: 2405941
- Website: toknc.com

Kernersville is a town in Forsyth County, North Carolina, and the largest suburb of Winston-Salem. The population was 26,481 at the 2020 census, an increase from 23,123 in 2010. While Kernersville is in the Winston-Salem Metropolitan area, the municipal limits of the town is also located inside the overall center of the Piedmont Triad, with the very small outskirts of the town also extending inside Guilford County (Greensboro-High Point Metropolitan Area), in which access to Downtown Kernersville from the east is via I-40 Exit 206 in the Guilford County municipality of Colfax.

== History ==
The site was first settled by an Irishman named Caleb Story in 1756. Circa 1770, the site was purchased by William Dobson and was called "Dobson's Crossroads". George Washington was served breakfast at Dobson's tavern on June 2, 1791. Joseph Kerner bought the property in 1817, continuing to operate the inn; the town became known as "Kerners Crossroads". Kerner (Joseph Kirner, born in Furtwangen im Schwarzwald Germany) left his property to two sons and a daughter. Not long after the arrival of the railroad, the town was incorporated as "Kernersville" in 1873.

There was brief flirtation with relocating the Minnesota Twins to Kernersville in 1998.

In late 2005, President George W. Bush visited Kernersville's Deere-Hitachi plant to give a speech about the American economy. In the summer of 2008, former president Bill Clinton spoke at R. B. Glenn High school. He was campaigning for his wife, Hillary Clinton, in the Democratic primary. Donald Trump Jr. hosted a campaign rally for his father and then-president, Donald Trump, at Salem One Inc. on October 19, 2020.

== Geography ==
Kernersville is located in East and Southeastern Forsyth County, with the town becoming "annexed" into the southern half of Forsyth County in recent years, though, the northern outskirts of the town is mostly considered to be "outside" of the southern half of the county, abandoning the previous designation of being in the northern half of the county. Winston-Salem is located west of the town, Greensboro is accessible to the east, High Point is located southeast of the town, Walkertown is located north and northwest of the town, and Wallburg is located south of the town. The stack/cloverleaf interchange with I-40 and I-74 is located directly west of the town limits of Kernersville, giving access to five of the largest cities in North Carolina, and also connecting the town with the rest of Southern Forsyth County. I-74 travels in the western and southern outskirts of the town. The stature of Southern Forsyth County (which includes Kernersville), includes economic considerations, shifted geography, and the likes, to connect to the "existing" hubs of Raleigh and Charlotte, the "developing" hub of Greensboro, and broader cross-regional access. Kernersville also extends near the Davidson County line.

According to the United States Census Bureau, the town has a total area of 17.4 square miles (45.1 km^{2}), of which 17.3 square miles (44.9 km^{2}) is land and 0.1 square miles (0.3 km^{2}), or 0.63%, is water.

== Demographics ==
Historical population
Census	Pop.	Note	%±
1880	585		—
1890	900		53.8%
1900	652		−27.6%
1910	1,128		73.0%
1920	1,219		8.1%
1930	1,754		43.9%
1940	2,103		19.9%
1950	2,396		13.9%
1960	2,942		22.8%
1970	4,815		63.7%
1980	5,875		22.0%
1990	10,836		84.4%
2000	17,126		58.0%
2010	23,123		35.0%
2020	26,449		14.4%
2025 (est.)	29,128	▲	10.1%
U.S. Decennial Census

=== 2020 census ===
As of the 2020 census, Kernersville had a population of 26,449. The median age was 42.2 years. 20.6% of residents were under the age of 18 and 19.3% of residents were 65 years of age or older. For every 100 females there were 87.9 males, and for every 100 females age 18 and over there were 84.9 males age 18 and over. There were 6,055 families in the town.

97.5% of residents lived in urban areas, while 2.5% lived in rural areas.

There were 11,827 households in Kernersville, of which 26.7% had children under the age of 18 living in them. Of all households, 41.9% were married-couple households, 18.8% were households with a male householder and no spouse or partner present, and 33.1% were households with a female householder and no spouse or partner present. About 34.9% of all households were made up of individuals and 14.5% had someone living alone who was 65 years of age or older.

There were 12,563 housing units, of which 5.9% were vacant. The homeowner vacancy rate was 1.3% and the rental vacancy rate was 7.3%.

Kernersville racial composition
Race	Number	Percentage
White (non-Hispanic)	17,690	66.88%
Black or African American (non-Hispanic)	4,050	15.31%
Native American	96	0.36%
Asian	524	1.98%
Pacific Islander	7	0.03%
Other/mixed	1,248	4.72%
Hispanic or Latino	2,834	10.71%

=== 2010 census ===
As of the census of 2010, there were 23,123 people, 7,286 households, and 4,663 families residing in the town. The population density was 1,415.7 inhabitants per square mile (546.6/km^{2}). There were 7,950 housing units at an average density of 657.2 per square mile (253.7/km^{2}). The racial makeup of the town was 84.11% White, 8.74% African American, 0.32% Native American, 1.26% Asian, 0.05% Pacific Islander, 4.33% from other races, and 1.19% from two or more races. Hispanic or Latino people of any race were 7.36% of the population.

There were 7,286 households, out of which 31.4% had children under the age of 18 living with them, 48.3% were married couples living together, 11.7% had a female householder with no husband present, and 36.0% were non-families. 30.4% of all households were made up of individuals, and 8.0% had someone living alone who was 65 years of age or older. The average household size was 2.31 and the average family size was 2.88.

In the town, the population was spread out, with 23.9% under the age of 18, 9.2% from 18 to 24, 33.8% from 25 to 44, 22.7% from 45 to 64, and 10.3% who were 65 years of age or older. The median age was 34 years. For every 100 females, there were 93.0 males. For every 100 females age 18 and over, there were 90.4 males.

The median income for a household in the town was $41,520, and the median income for a family was $52,266. Males had a median income of $36,777 versus $26,873 for females. The per capita income for the town was $23,506. About 6.3% of families and 8.4% of the population were below the poverty line, including 11.6% of those under age 18 and 11.7% of those age 65 or over.

== Arts and culture ==
Attractions and events include:

- Korner's Folly, completed in 1880, which features 22 rooms on seven levels, 15 decorated fireplaces, and the first private theatre in the United States, dating to 1896. A model of the house was made into an ornament to represent North Carolina on the White House Christmas tree in 2001.
- The annual Honeybee Festival
- The Paul J. Ciener Botanical Garden
- Kernersville Museum, which focuses on town history
- The 1873 Train Depot, the original train depot in Kernersville

First Baptist Church, Kernersville Depot, Korner's Folly, Isaac Harrison McKaughan House, North Cherry Street Historic District, Roberts-Justice House, South Main Street Historic District, and Stuart Motor Company are all listed on the National Register of Historic Places.

== Education ==
Winston-Salem/Forsyth County Schools covers the portions in Forsyth County, which make up a majority of the city.

Kernersville is served by five public elementary schools, three public middle schools, and two public high schools – Robert B. Glenn High School and East Forsyth High School. These public schools are all a part of the Winston-Salem/Forsyth County Schools system.

Guilford County Schools covers portions in Guilford County.

Kernersville is also home to four private schools, most prominently the Brookside Montessori School and Triad Baptist Christian Academy, as well as Bishop McGuinness Catholic High School.

Kernersville contains a campus of Forsyth Technical Community College.

== Infrastructure ==
=== Transportation ===
Highways include:

- I-40
- I-74 (routed along the Winston-Salem Beltway between Exits 53 to 55)
- US 421 (routed along the Salem Parkway)
- NC 66
- NC 150
- Kernersville Loop (under construction)

== Notable people ==
- Madison Bailey, actress notable for her role of Kiara Carrera on the Netflix series Outer Banks
- Turner Battle, college basketball coach
- Larry R. Brown, former member of the North Carolina House of Representatives
- Janet Danahey, an American mass murderer
- Mitch Easter, musician and producer
- Drew Fulk, songwriter and producer
- DeLana Harvick, former co-manager of Kevin Harvick Incorporated and wife of NASCAR driver Kevin Harvick
- Chris Lane, country music singer
- Brent LaRue, represented Slovenia in the men's 400 meters hurdles at the 2012 Summer Olympics
- John Linville, former NASCAR Xfinity Series driver
- Ben Newnam, professional soccer player
- Ramekon O'Arwisters, artist
- Danny O'Brien, former Canadian Football League quarterback and current coach
- Pat Preston, former NFL player; later served as the athletic director of Wake Forest University from 1954 to 1955
- Kemp Wicker, former MLB pitcher and two-time World Series champion with the New York Yankees (1936, 1937)
