= Isaac Harrison McKaughan House =

Historic house in North Carolina, United States

- U.S. National Register of Historic Places
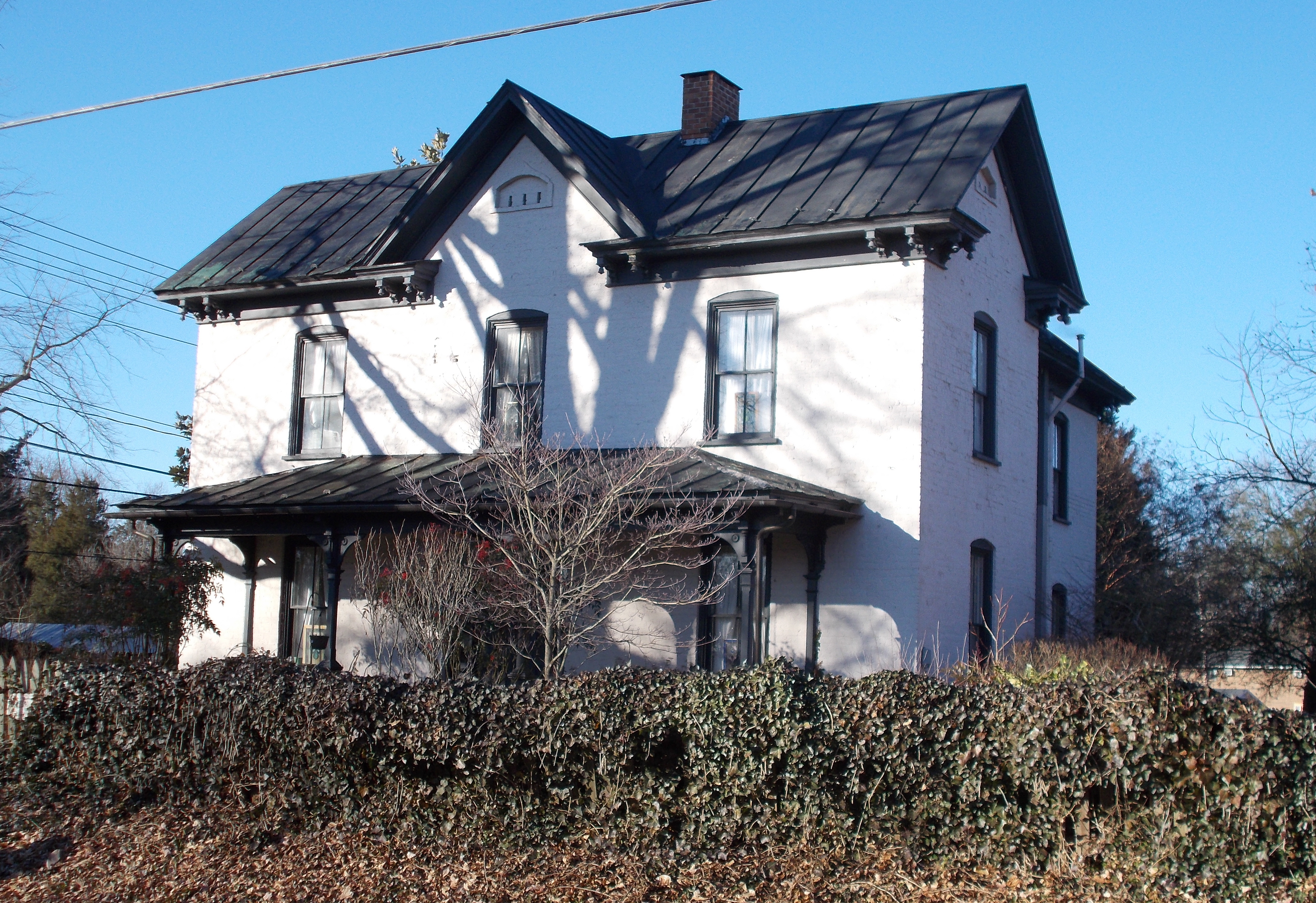
- Isaac Harrison McKaughan House, January 2015

- Location within North Carolina Location within the United States
- Location: 510 Salisbury St., Kernersville, North Carolina
- Coordinates: 36°6′49″N 80°4′40″W
- Area: less than one acre
- Built: c. 1875
- Architectural style: Italianate
- MPS: Kernersville MPS
- NRHP reference No.: 88000127
- Added to NRHP: February 11, 1988

Isaac Harrison McKaughan House is a historic home located at Kernersville, Forsyth County, North Carolina. It was built about 1875, and is a two-story, L-shaped Italianate-style brick farmhouse. It has a central hall plan and two-room rear ell.

It was listed on the National Register of Historic Places in 1988.
