= South Main Street Historic District (Kernersville, North Carolina) =

Historic district in North Carolina, United States

- U.S. National Register of Historic Places
- U.S. Historic district
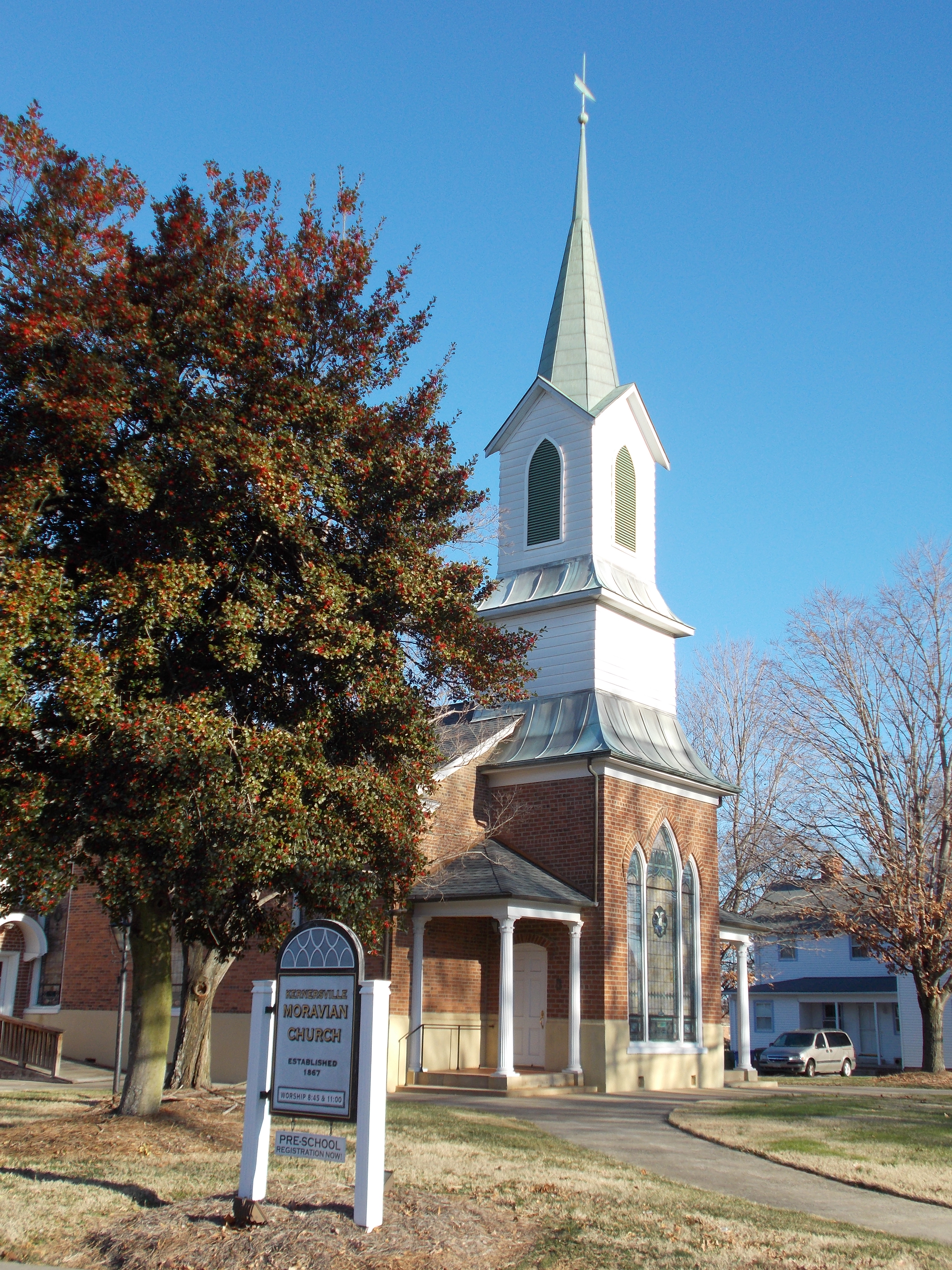
- Kernersville Moravian Church, South Main Street Historic District, Kernersville NC, January 2015

- Location within North Carolina Location within the United States
- Location: 100--600 blocks of S. Main St., Kernersville, North Carolina
- Coordinates: 36°7′15″N 80°4′27″W
- Area: 45 acres (18 ha)
- Built: 1880
- Built by: Korner, Jules Gilmer
- Architectural style: Late 19th And 20th Century Revivals, Mid 19th Century Revival, Late Victorian
- MPS: Kernersville MPS
- NRHP reference No.: 88000137
- Added to NRHP: February 25, 1988

South Main Street Historic District is a national historic district located at Kernersville, Forsyth County, North Carolina. The district encompasses 53 contributing buildings, 2 contributing sites, and 2 contributing objects in Kernersville. They include residential and commercial buildings built between about 1834 and 1930 in a variety of popular architectural styles including Colonial Revival, Queen Anne, and Bungalow / American Craftsman style. Located in the district is the separately listed Korner's Folly. Other notable buildings include the Spears House (c. 1834), Dr. Elias Kerner House (1857), Elias Kerner Huff House (1880), Greenfield and Kerner Tobacco Factory (1884), (former) Bank of Kernersville (1903), DeWitt Harmon's Office (c. 1928), Kernersville Moravian Church (1922), and Main Street United Methodist Church (1924/25).

It was listed on the National Register of Historic Places in 1988.

== Gallery ==
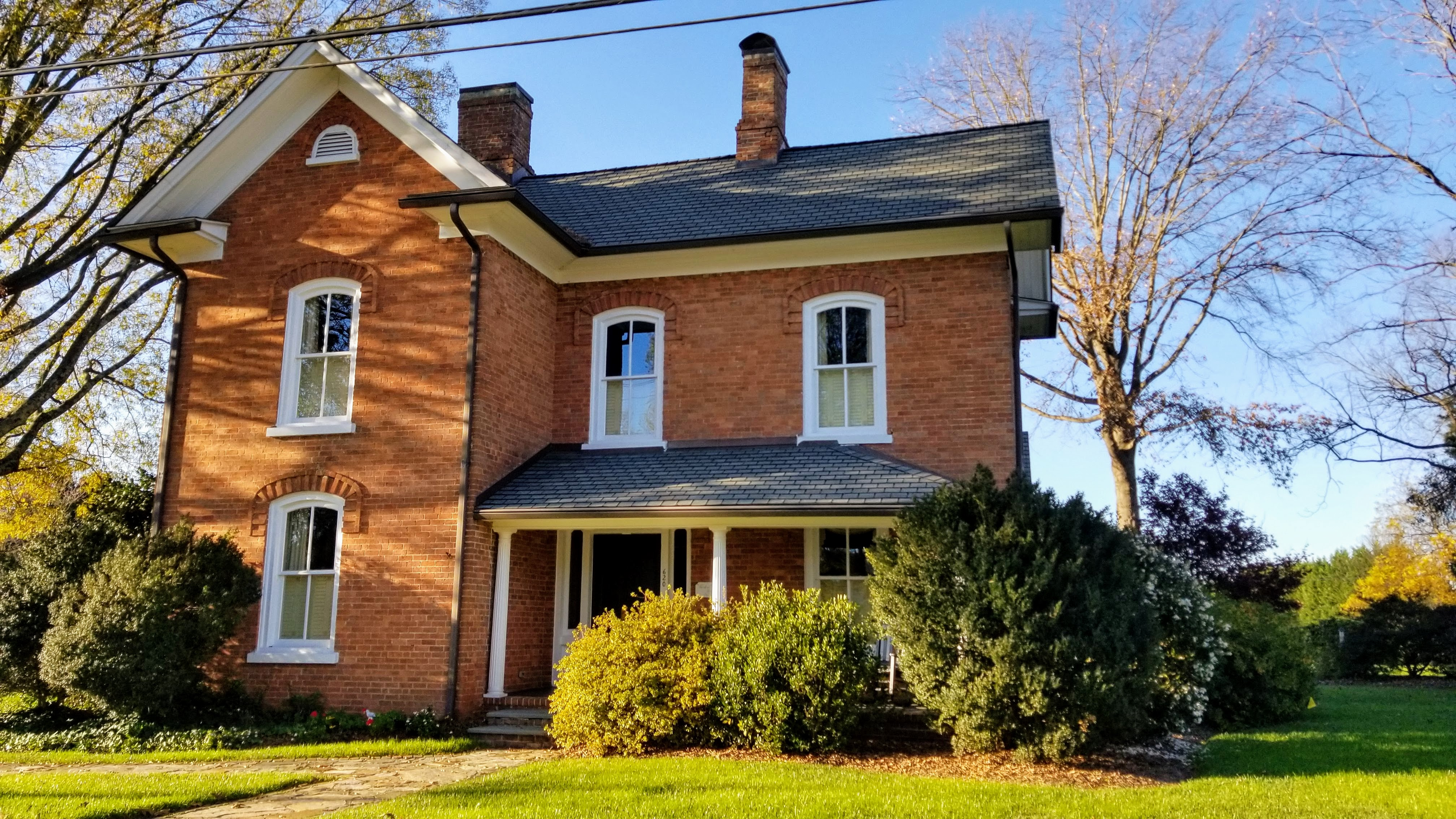
Theodore E. Kerner House, 2020

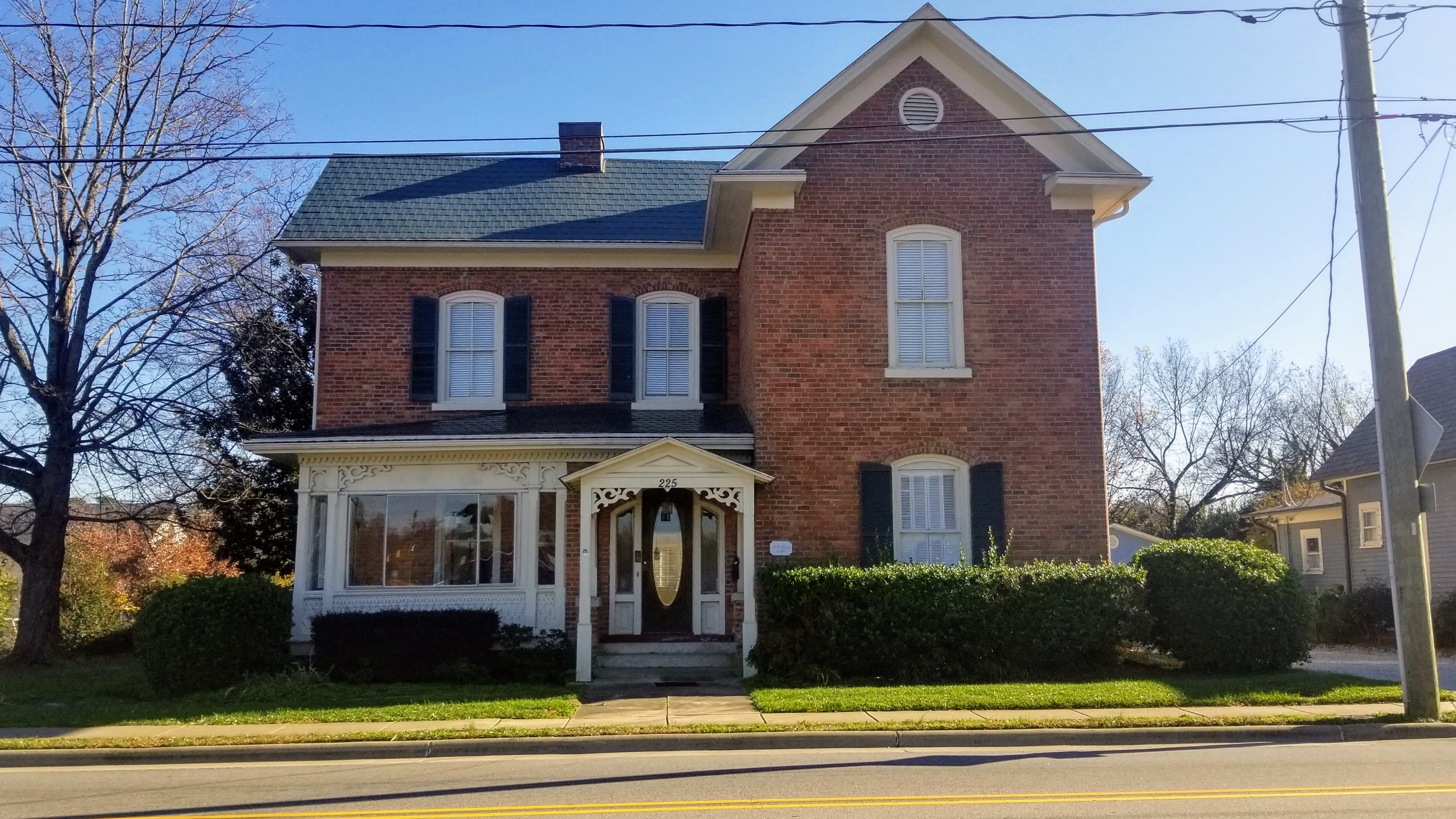
Rephelius Byron Kerner House, 2020

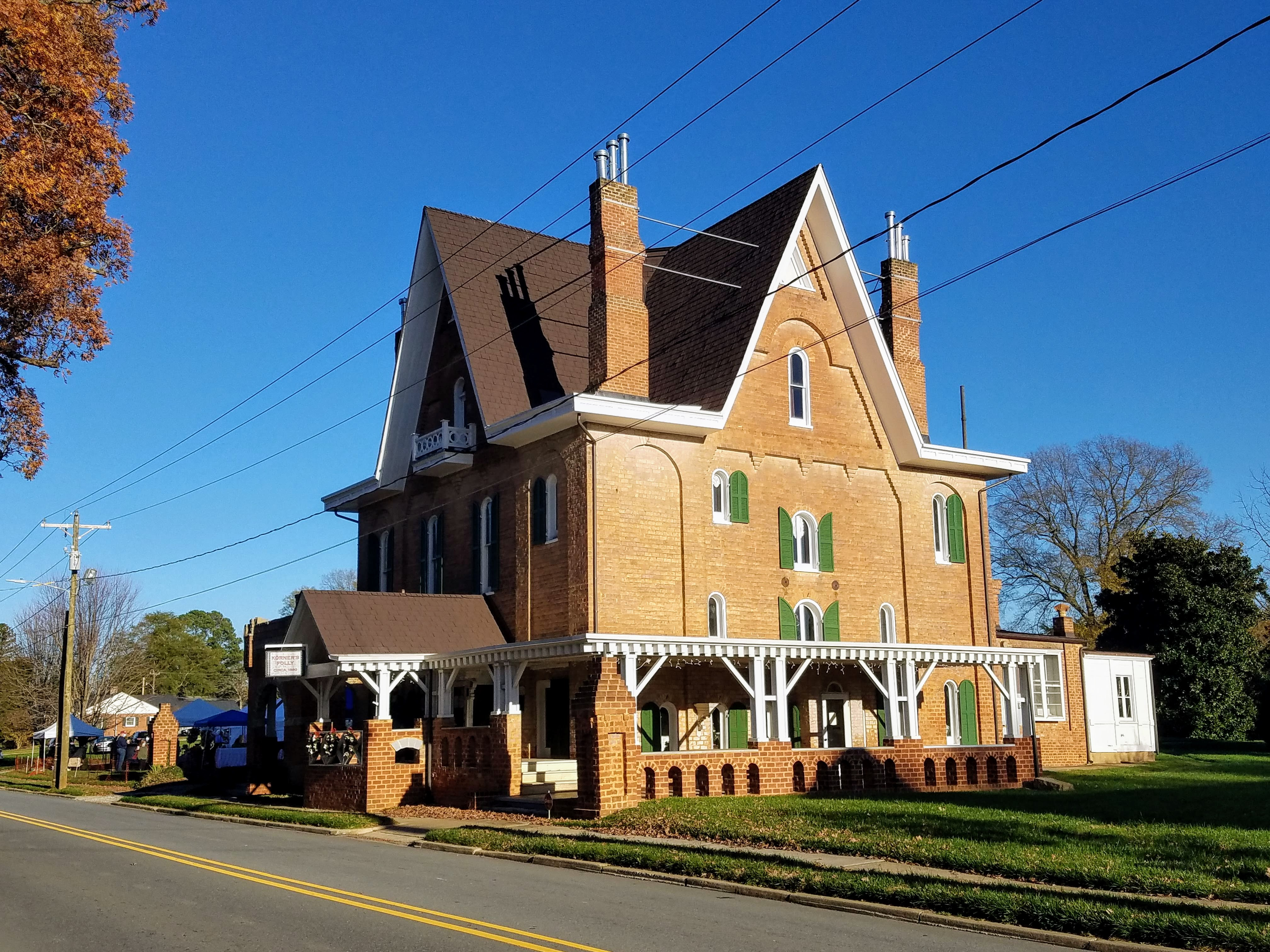
Korner's Folly, 2020
