= Ramekon O'Arwisters =

American artist (born 1960)

Ramekon O'Arwisters (born August 15, 1960) is an African-American artist, best known for his fabric and social-art practice, Crochet Jam. He creates art using the folk-art tradition of rag-rug weaving. Ramekon's work has been exhibited in New York, North Carolina, Tokyo, Bologna, Miami Beach, and San Francisco. He is also the former curator of fine-art photography at SFO Museum.

== Early life and education ==
Ramekon was born in Kernersville, North Carolina. He grew up on a farm. His parents worked in a cotton factory in Winston-Salem, North Carolina. He finished college at the University of North Carolina in 1982 with a B.A. in psychology and political science. In 1986, he earned a Master of Divinity (M.Div.) degree from Duke University School of Divinity in Durham, North Carolina. Ramekon now resides in San Francisco.

== Career ==
Ramekon's work is informed by a cherished childhood memory that is steeped in the African-American tradition of weaving and quilting. Ramekon explores the context of resistance and conformity, between control and freedom by weaving free-form, organic fabric sculptures. He is the recipient of the 2014 Eureka Fellowship Award administered by the Fleishhacker Foundation and the Artadia Award in 2003. In 2016, Ramekon was an artist at the Recology San Francisco Artist in Residence Program where he spent four months working towards an exhibition and talking to tour groups about reuse and his practice.

== Bibliography ==
- "Recycle, Reuse, Create. The Latest from Recology's Artist in Residence Program - SF Station - San Francisco's City Guide". sfstation.com.
- "Redefining Touch: A Conversation with James Fleming, Kelly Lovemonster, and boychild : Open Space". openspace.sfmoma.org. 5 January 2017.
- "Artist Ramekon O'Arwisters Makes Crochet Cool Again With Social Justice-Themed Quilting Parties - 7x7 Bay Area". 7x7.com.
- "Reopening: San Francisco Arts Commission Gallery | Art Practical". artpractical.com.
- "news.artnet.com/market/artadias-15th-birthday-adventure-in-nyc-130727". news.artnet.com. 16 October 2014.
- "Danny Orendorff's last Charlotte Street show favors text over texture". pitch.com.
- "CROCHET JAM". crochetjam.com.
