= North Cherry Street Historic District (Kernersville, North Carolina) =

Historic district in North Carolina, United States

- U.S. National Register of Historic Places
- U.S. Historic district
- Location within North Carolina Location within the United States
- Location: 100 blk. N. Cherry St., Kernersville, North Carolina
- Coordinates: 36°7′15″N 80°4′27″W
- Area: 3.5 acres (1.4 ha)
- Built: c. 1900
- Built by: Lancey, Albert; Nelson, Sherman
- Architectural style: Late 19th And 20th Century Revivals, Bungalow/craftsman, Italianate
- MPS: Kernersville MPS
- NRHP reference No.: 88000118
- Added to NRHP: February 25, 1988

North Cherry Street Historic District is a national historic district located at Kernersville, Forsyth County, North Carolina. The district encompasses 10 contributing residential buildings in Kernersville. They include dwellings built between about 1900 and 1930 in a variety of popular architectural styles including Colonial Revival, Italianate, and Bungalow / American Craftsman style.

It was listed on the National Register of Historic Places in 1988.
