= Roberts-Justice House =

Historic house in North Carolina, United States

- U.S. National Register of Historic Places
- Location within North Carolina Location within the United States
- Location: 133 N. Main St., Kernersville, North Carolina
- Coordinates: 36°7′13″N 80°4′23″W
- Area: less than one acre
- Built: 1877, 1916
- Architectural style: Colonial Revival, Italianate
- MPS: Kernersville MPS
- NRHP reference No.: 88000129
- Added to NRHP: February 25, 1988

Roberts-Justice House was a historic home located at Kernersville, Forsyth County, North Carolina. It was built in 1877, and is a two-story, L-shaped Italianate style brick dwelling. It has a one-story rear kitchen ell. It was remodeled in 1916 in the Colonial Revival style.

It was listed on the National Register of Historic Places in 1988.

The structure was demolished in 2013 after sustaining fire damage in 2009.
