= North Wilkesboro station =

Historic building in North Carolina, US

- Southern Railway Depot
- U.S. National Register of Historic Places
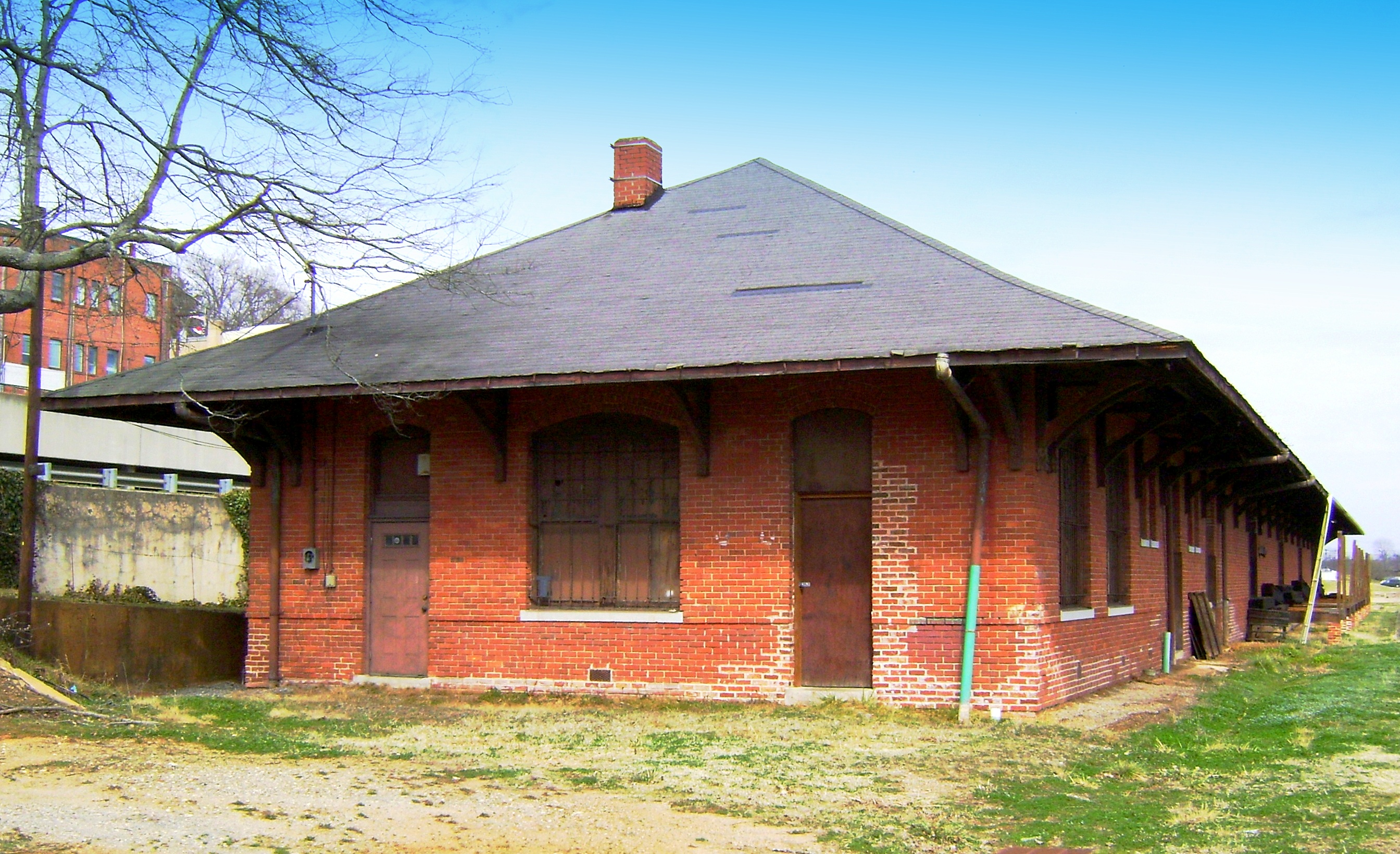
- Southern Railway Depot, March 2009

- Location within North Carolina Location within the United States
- Location: Jct. of Ninth St. and CBD Loop, North Wilkesboro, North Carolina
- Coordinates: 36°9′31″N 81°8′45″W
- Area: less than one acre
- Built: 1914
- Architectural style: Bungalow/craftsman
- NRHP reference No.: 04000965
- Added to NRHP: September 10, 2004

Southern Railway Depot, also known as the North Wilkesboro Depot, is a historic train station located near North Wilkesboro, Wilkes County, North Carolina. It was built in 1914 by the Southern Railway, and is a long, one-story brick building with American Craftsman style design elements. It measures 36 feet wide and 240 feet long and has a low hipped roof with overhanging eaves. Passenger service ceased in 1955.

It was listed on the National Register of Historic Places in 2004.

Preceding station	Southern Railway	Following station
Terminus	North Wilkesboro – Morehead City	Roaring River toward Morehead City
