= Hanes Park =

Park in Forsyth County, North Carolina, US

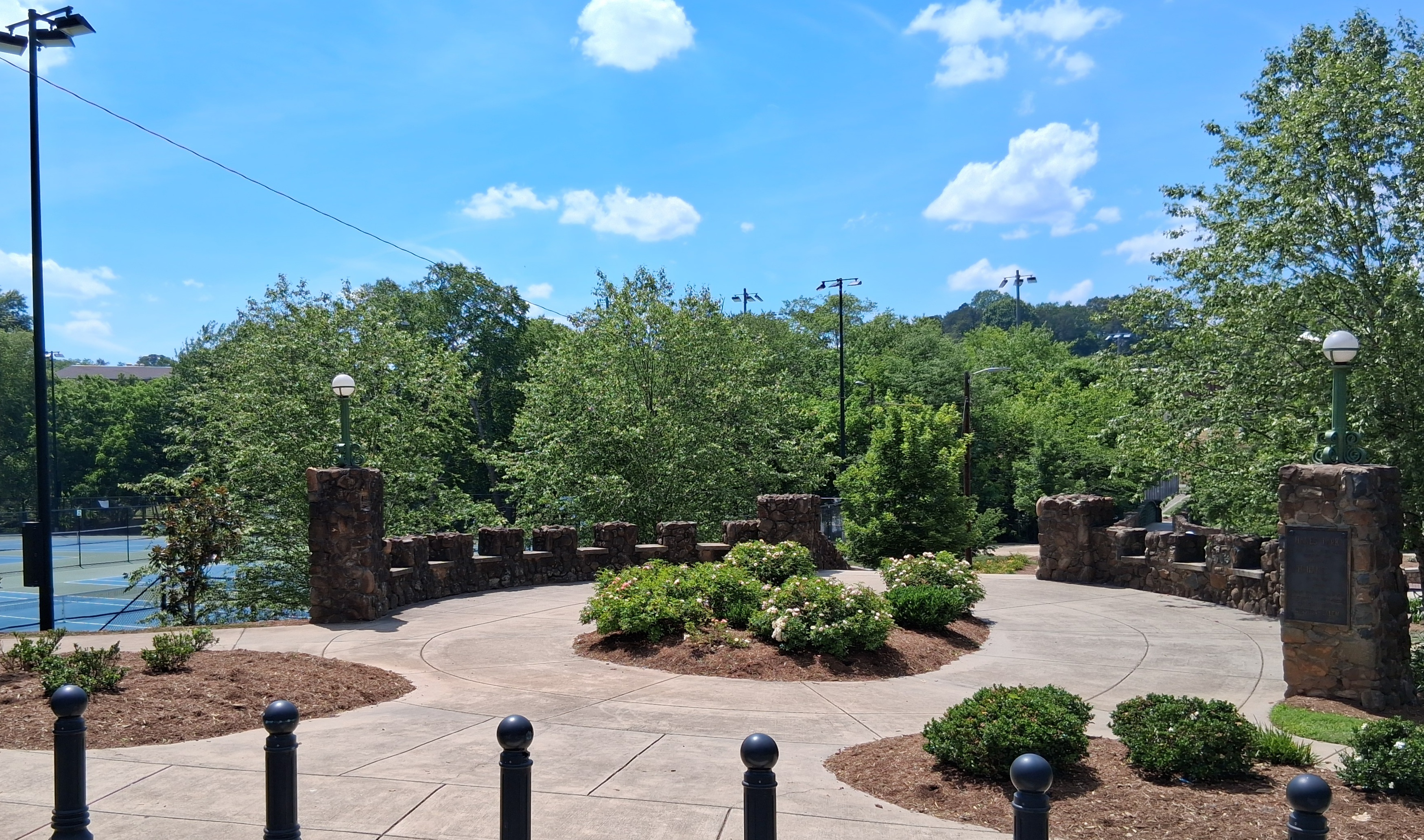
- Main Entrance
- Interactive map of Hanes Park
- Type: Public Park
- Location: Winston-Salem, NC
- Coordinates: 36°5′57″N 80°15′48″W
- Area: 34.82 acres (14 ha; 0.054 miles sq; 0.140 kn sq) (Original tract: 47 acres)
- Elevation: 781ft (238 meters)
- Established: 1919
- Founder: Pleasant Henderson Hanes, Sr.
- Designer: Louis L. Miller
- Owner: City of Winston-Salem
- Open: Sunrise to Sunset
- Status: Open all year
- Hiking trails: 1.1 miles along Peters Creek

Hanes Park is a public park located in the city of Winston-Salem, North Carolina, United States. It is centrally located in the city, bordered on three sides by the historic West End Neighborhood. Peters Creek runs for approximately one-half mile through the central portion of the park, representing the northern boundary of the West End Historic District. The park is equipped with a playground, 20 lighted tennis courts, (14 clay and 6 hard surface), 2 open play fields, a ¼ mile (400 meter) all-weather running track, and a 1.1 mile walking trail along Peters Creek. It is also home to R. J. Reynolds High School tennis, football, softball, track and field, and baseball. The land comprising Hanes Park was originally owned by manufacturer and civic leader P. H. Hanes Sr., on which operated his "West End Dairy Farm" whose prize Holstein Friesian cattle won numerous awards throughout the state. In 1919, the land comprising the West End Dairy Farm was donated by Hanes "to be used as a park for the benefit and pleasure of the citizens of Winston-Salem."

== History ==
=== Colonial era ===
==== Peters Creek ====
One of the first waterways to be named in the area, Peters Creek or "Petersbach" as it was originally known, initially appeared on maps drawn by Moravian settlers in 1766. Hans Peterson, for whom the creek is believed to have been named, was born in Holstein (Denmark). Records indicate that he was a tailor, who later founded the first school in Wachovia along with his wife Elizabeth.

==== The Shallowford Road ====
Shallowford Road, which crossed-over the Petersbach and formed the western edge of the property that would become Hanes Park, was the primary road traveled by the Moravians when they initially entered Wachovia to establish settlement. The road stretched from "Shallow Ford" in the Yadkin river that allowed for passage; and by 1772 ended in the area that is today Burke Street. Years later, two large sections of the road were renamed "Country Club Road" and "First Street."

=== Hanes Park's beginning ===
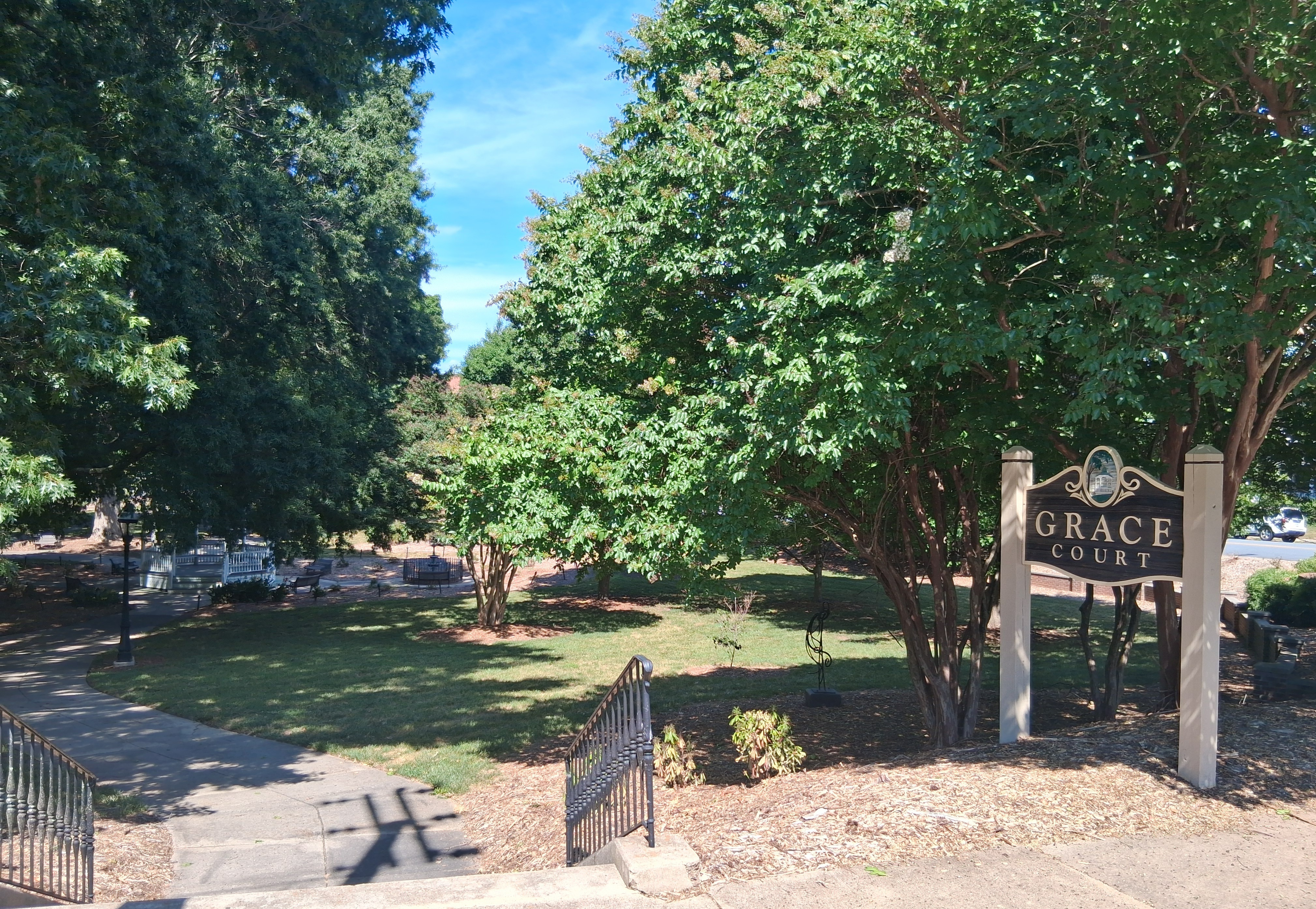
Grace Court, 2026

==== Grace Court ====
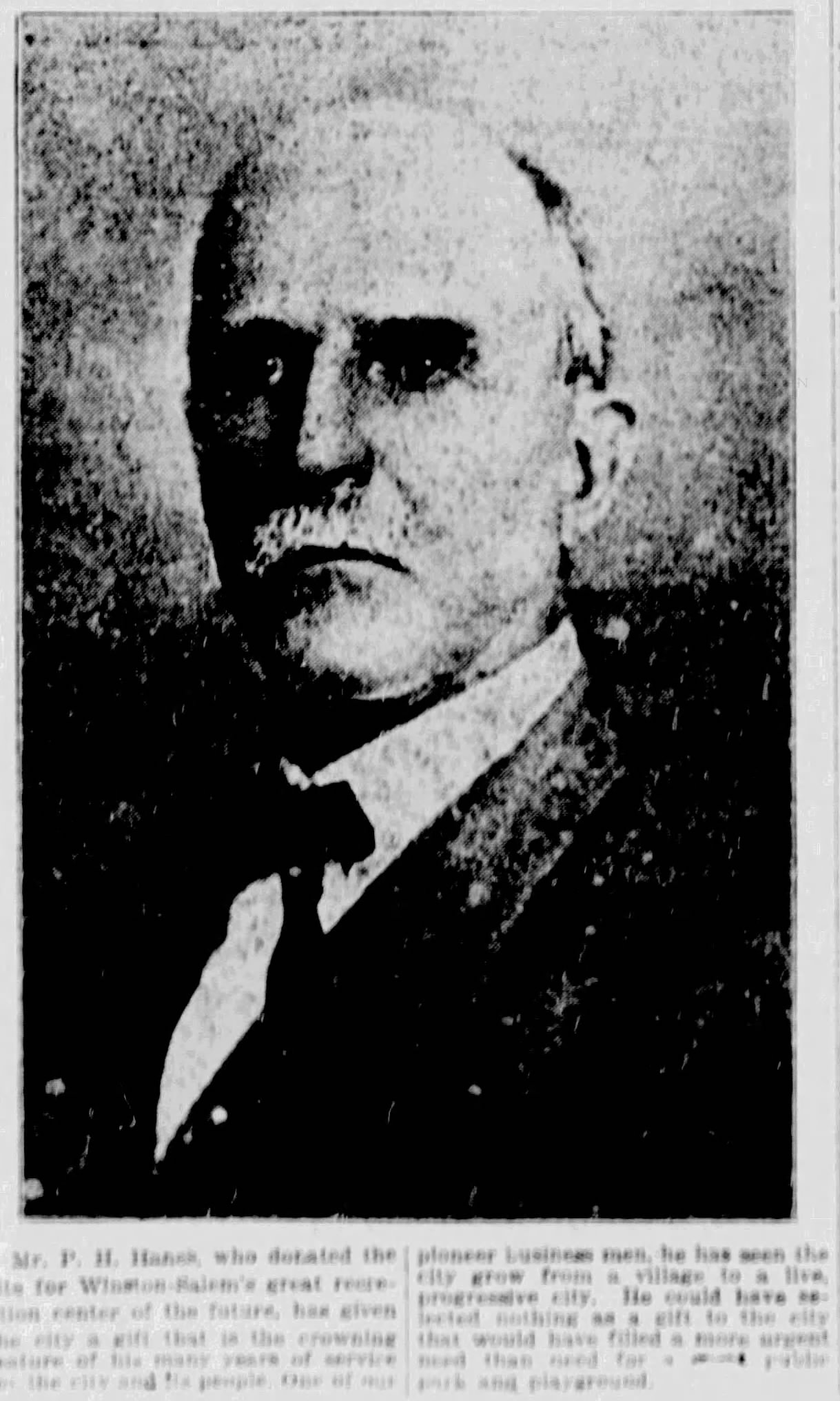
Pleasant Henderson Hanes, Sr.

Four blocks up the hill from Hanes Park at the other end of Glade Street sits Grace Court. This small tract of land was originally set aside for park purposes by developers in 1905. In the summer of 1919, the Twin City Sentinel newspaper reminded the citizens of Winston-Salem why Pleasant Henderson Hanes, Sr. could be termed "the father of the park system."

"Mr. Hanes was a stockholder and director in the old West End Land Company which laid out the first residential development of real estate as the city grew westward. In that development a tract of land was set apart for park purposes, known as Grace Court. In later years this fact was lost sight of and the property was cut up in lots and was to be sold for building sites. Mr. Hanes protested and at his own expense backed a litigation which protected this...municipal park...and turned it back to the city for that purpose. But for this act on the part of Mr. Hanes the people of the community would not have enjoyed the evenings that have been possible in Grace Court, and that attractive green would now be covered with buildings..."

==== West End Dairy Farm ====
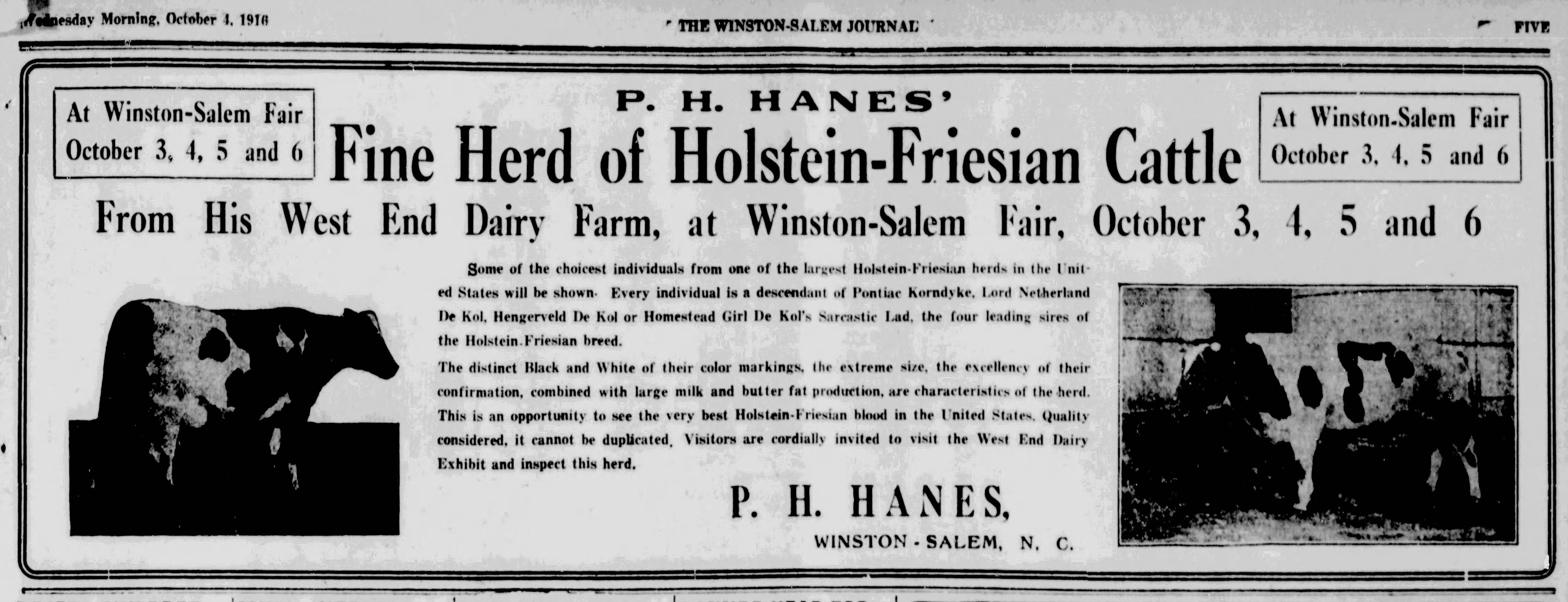
West End Dairy Farm, October 4, 1916

The land comprising Hanes Park prior to donation was primarily occupied by the "West End Dairy Farm," owned by P. H. Hanes, Sr. In the years before its donation, the farm was a model of ideal dairy production. As one writer from the prestigious "Holstein-Friesian Register" of Battleboro, Vermont noted after visiting the farm: "The magnificent specimens of dairy animals in the herd are enthusiastically commented on by all who have visited the selection of the county, and as everything is conducted on a scientific, yet practical basis and everything on the farm is of modern construction, it is little wonder that the Hanes herd of Holsteins under such ideal conditions as those existing in the West End Dairy, must mean not only a great amount of pleasure, but also an excellent return of the original investment."

The President of the association remarked that he "had never seen a better collection of individuals and that the cattle produced by Hanes in Forsyth county are as well bred cattle as he has seen." The Western Sentinel reported that "the Holsteins exhibited by the P. H. Hanes Dairy and Stock Farm and the Jerseys exhibited by the Reynolda Farm, presented splendid types of dairy stock..."

In 1919 when the decision was made to donate the dairy farm as a public park, it was considered by the Winston-Salem Journal "to be without a doubt the finest piece of real estate in Winston-Salem at this time." The farm itself was located at the foothill of the affluent West End Neighborhood, largely consisting of grand residences rising hundreds of feet upon the hills above. Central to this neighborhood was Summit Street, which later boasted sweeping views out over Hanes Park. Today the base of Summit Street is not marked, although its splayed entrance at the park's northeastern corner is still a vibrant part of the city.

Early images of the farm

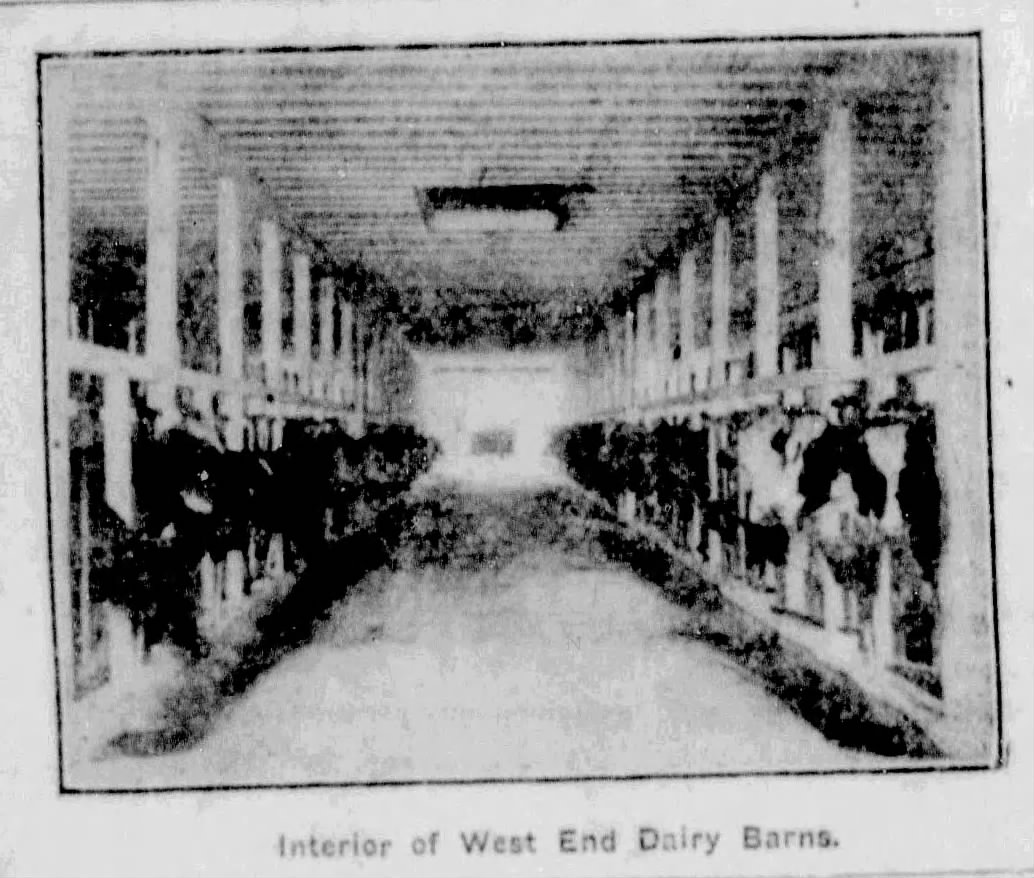
West End Dairy Farm, October 18, 1915

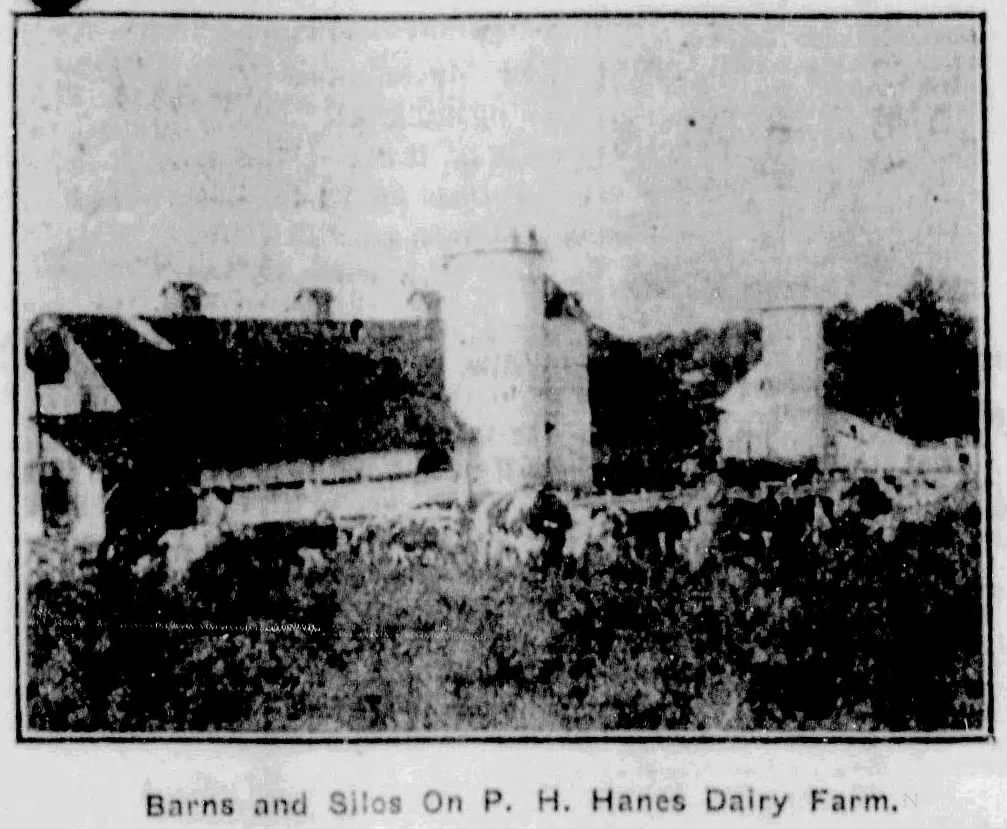
West End Dairy Farm, October 18, 1915

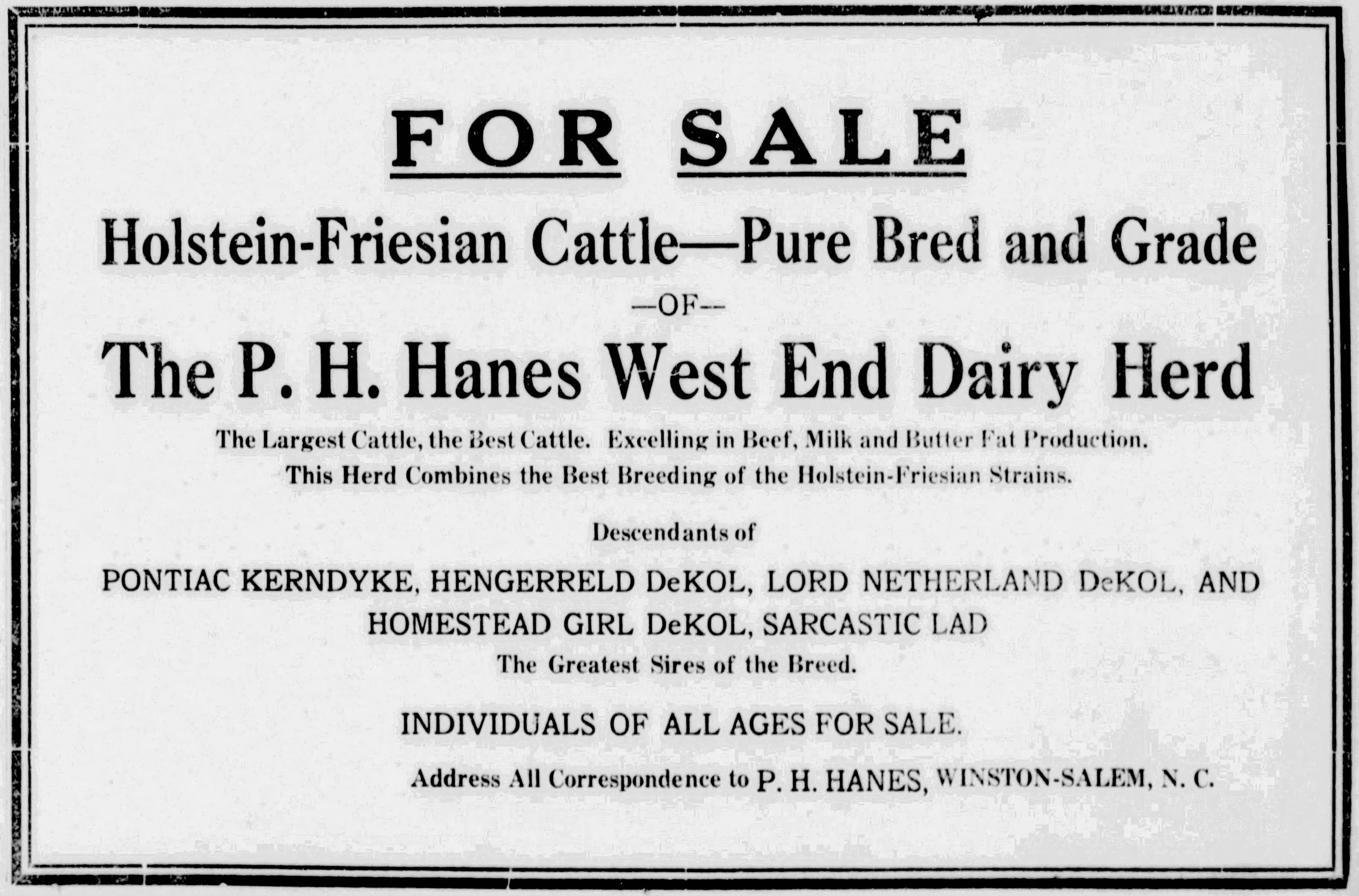
The Sale of the Sarcastic Lad, October 4, 1919

==== An early visit from Chautauqua ====
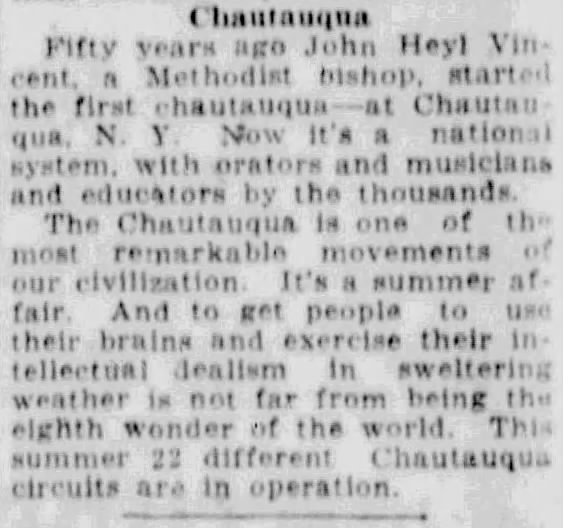
Winston-Salem Journal, July 9, 1924

The "Chautauqua" grew from a group of Methodist Sunday-school teachers who originally took their name from a lake in New York. A welcome and prolific source of education and entertainment for towns across America in the late 19th and early 20th century, they evolved into multiple traveling entities, many with massive tents and various entertainers and speakers who lectured on various subjects. Notable Americans who spoke and traveled with the Chautauqua included Booker T. Washington, William Jennings Bryan, Susan B. Anthony, Theodore Roosevelt and Emilia Earhart. On July 13, 1919, W.E. Vaughan-Lloyd, the first director of playgrounds and parks, reported to the Winston-Salem Board of Aldermen that the tennis courts in Hanes Park would be getting back stops, and "the Chautauqua used this ground and left it in miserable condition, however, steps are being taken to put in first class order in the near future."

==== Flooding in Winston-Salem in the 1920s ====
The Western North Carolina mountains are the highest in the Appalachian Mountain range, and the city of Winston-Salem is situated in their foothills. In the middle of Winston-Salem, in the valley of the Peters Creek basin, runs the "Hanes Park Branch of Peters Creek." That problematic hydrological setting initially put Hanes Park at the center of flooding issues in the City for over a decade. In May 1927, work began to culvert "Peters Brook" throughout Hanes Park and much of the creek began to go underground.

This only partially worked. The flooding continued and it was reported on July 10th of 1928, that "Hanes Park presented the appearance of a good size lake being filled with water from bank to bank." 3.70 inches of rain then fell a month later, and "Of course, Hanes Park is flooded. The greater part of the playground space is under several inches of water and the section near the intersection of Glade Street and Hawthorne Road seems to have a covering several feet deep. The present system of drainage, constructed during recent years, apparently is unable to care for the flow..."

As this weather report from the Winston-Salem Journal on July 10, 1928 shows, flooding in a metropolitan area in the 1920s brought hazards that were no laughing matter:

"The heavy rain raised Peters Creek to the greatest flood in the past year and a half. Lightening blew fuses on street cars and did slight damage in a number of places over Winston-Salem. Numerous automobiles were flooded and traffic in general was held up temporarily. No wind accompanied the rainfall of sufficient force to do damage."

In July 1931, once again "Hanes Park was turned into a lake..." This time the steel truss foot bridge on the southern side of the Park washed out, and it took several days to drag it back upstream with tractors (the remnants of the ordeal can still be seen today). A National Geodectic Survey was conducted in 1932. This work was performed in conjunction with multiple drainage projects that culminated in the excavation of Peters Creek for 2 ½ miles from just before Hanes Park through the middle of the city to Salem Creek. By January 1936, "In Hanes Park for the first time in history, the grounds were wholly clear of any overflow from Peters Creek. The drainage project completed the previous year with CWA funds worked 'Like a charm'" and "was regarded by public works officials yesterday to have stood the "acid test.""

Also included with these projects was the construction of a three-barrel box culvert bridge over Reynolda Road. The "Peters Creek Bridge" was part of the "Forsyth County State Project No. 7471 built by" the "North Carolina State Highway and Public Works Commission with Federal Aid" and was completed in 1934. It spans Peters Creek at the Northeast corner of Hanes Park, and is still a highly traveled corridor today.

Early reports of flooding

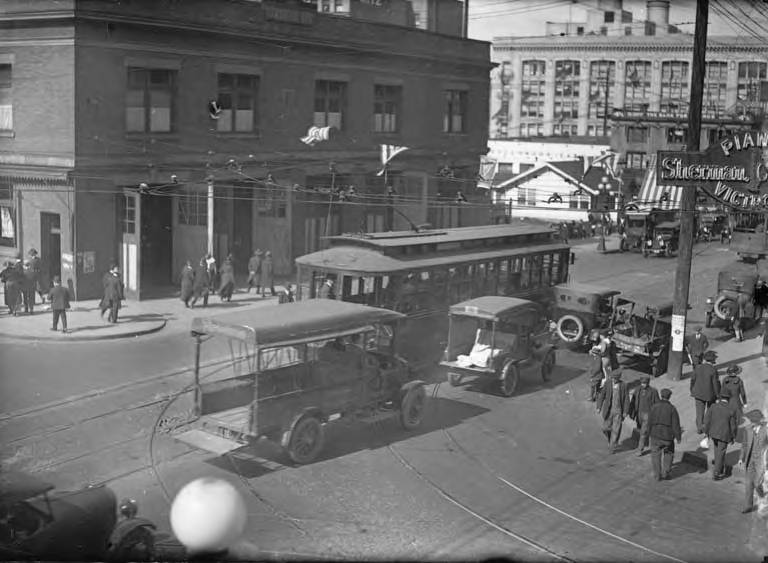
Many metropolitan cities in the U.S. were lined with streetcars in the 1920s

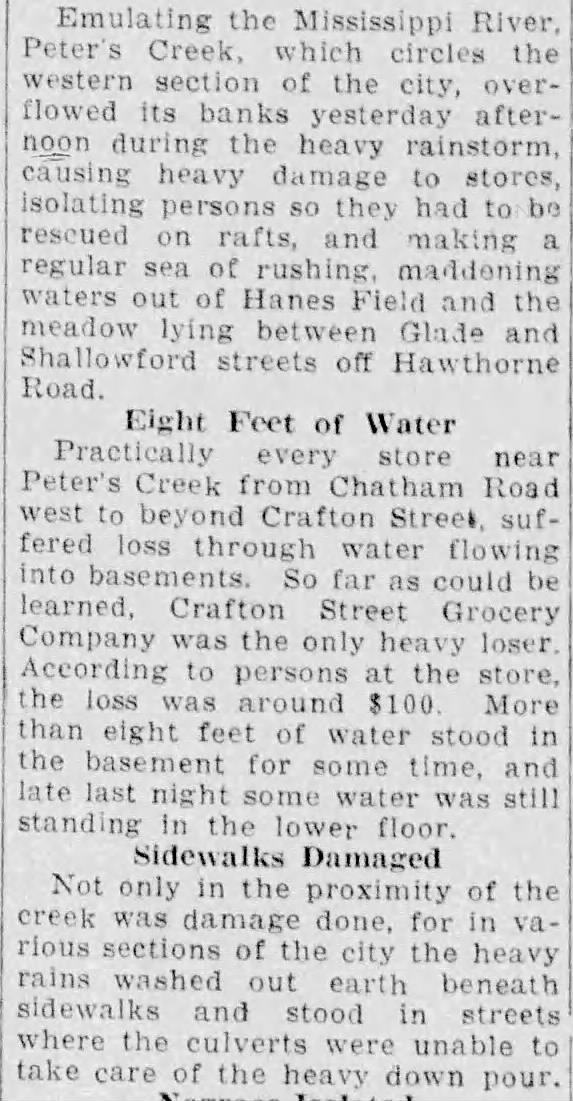
Winston-Salem Journal, June 14, 1927

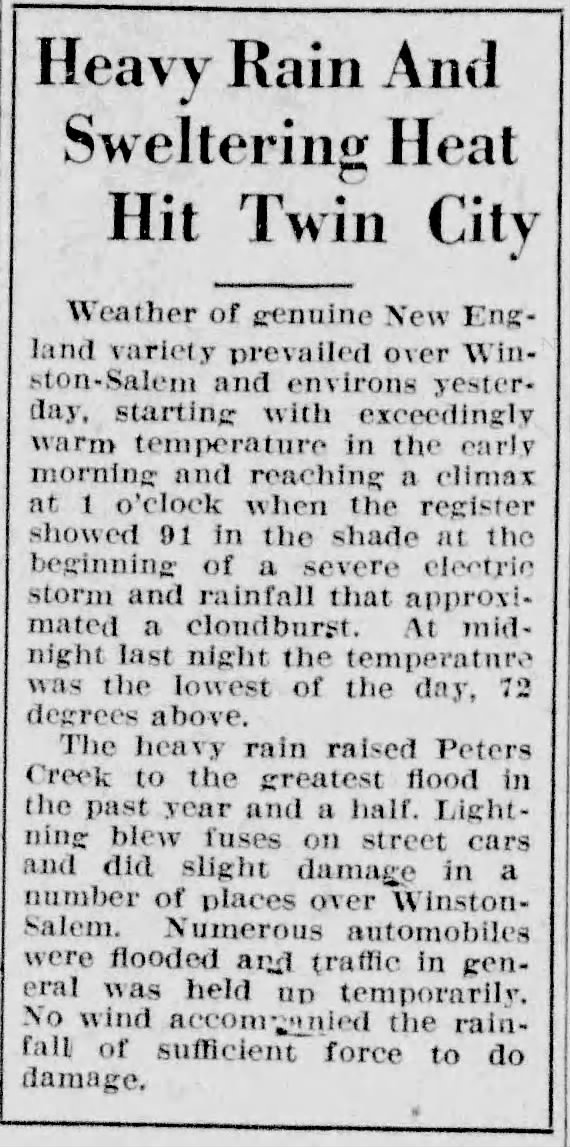
Winston-Salem Journal, July 10, 1928

==== Gifted names ====
The names "Hanes Park" and "Richard J. Reynolds High School" have always been the designated names of each facility since the beginning. However, in the years following the founding of R. J. Reynolds High School and Hanes Park, for the reference purposes of the common reader at the time, the newspapers sometimes referred to the school as "Winston High School," or a baseball game would be played at, "Hanes Field." This is not to be confused with the conflagration that was Winston-Salem City High School on Cherry Street downtown, or the old Hanes Field in Durham named in honor of P. H. Hanes Jr., where the Bulls played their home games from 1913 to 1925, the location of which is now Williams Field at Jack Katz Stadium, the home of Duke University Field Hockey.

=== Early athletics ===
==== Tennis ====
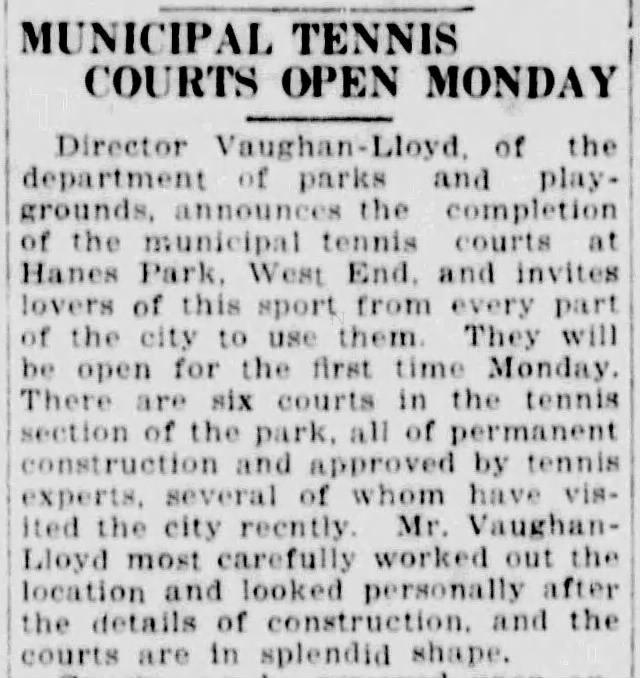
Grand opening of the Hanes Park tennis courts, May 28, 1921

The sport of tennis and the care for its game and those who play it have been of paramount importance in Hanes Park since its inception. The original courts were "constructed of twelve inch timbers" with "a specially mixed soil and sand composition which will provide a splendid surface for the courts at all times, but it is hoped, at least by next season, to provide a permanent surface 6 or 8 inches deep..." In the summer of 1922, the grading of the play surfaces were deemed unsatisfactory, and the courts were rebuilt. Drinking fountains were installed, and "two arbors were erected for the protection of the players against the sun and rain, and vines were planted to cover them" as "the courts are crowded almost the whole day thru (sic)." By May 1922, reservations for the courts began being directed through the downtown Y.M.C.A., as the volume of calls coming into the Parks and Recreation department grew too large to manage properly. That year, a citywide tournament was held. This "was a gala day at the tennis courts at Hanes Park," and first prize for "singles champion of the city" was a "Dayton steel racquet" donated by the Twin-City Sentinel newspaper. When the United States retained the Davis Cup in 1922, a picture of the Cup made the paper.

==== Baseball ====
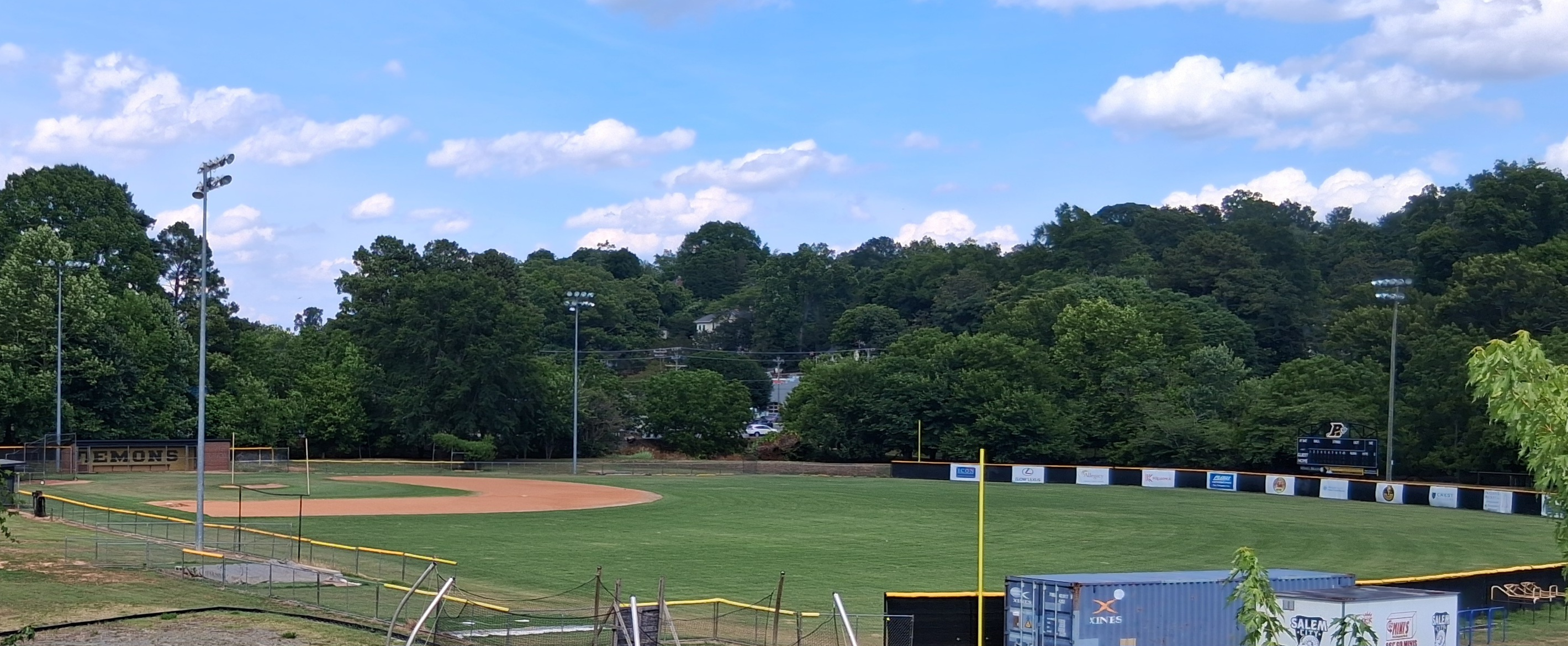
Original baseball diamond in the NW corner of Hanes Park, 2026

1919, the year of Hanes Park's founding, was also the year of the Chicago "Black Sox" major scandal, where 8 members of the Chicago White Sox professional baseball team were ejected from baseball for life. This story cast a shadow on baseball across America, and that shadow no doubt reached Hanes Park. Yet all throughout the early years after the Park's founding, minor league teams developed from businesses, civic groups, churches, and rival towns, and baseball was "proving to be as popular as ever." Local newspaper coverage at the local, state, and national level was comprehensive and enthusiastic. At one point the Winston-Salem Journal announced that the High Point team hit a "whopper," and hopeful "diamond artists" playing in Hanes Park in the 1920s could look to the Piedmont League, where the Winston-Salem Twins might play the Durham Bulls. In 1948, lights were installed for the field. A priority since its inception, historical accounts and early photographs show that "Ballfield No. 1" has been situated looking out from the northwest corner of Hanes Park for over 100 years.

==== Track and field ====
Track and Field also played an important role in the early activities of Hanes Park. In 1922, "A topographical survey" was "made of all Park areas" to ensure properly level fields and drainage. During the 1920s, the prevailing attitude was one of "the ideal of the pure amateur who played for the love of sport," and track and field was seen as the epitome of athleticism in its purest form of competition. The facilities in Hanes Park were well maintained; and in 1931 a cinder track was installed. Overall, 1931 was a good year; as R. J. Reynolds High School won their third-straight North Carolina State Cross Country championship, in a competition held in Hanes Park.

=== Three handsome gifts ===
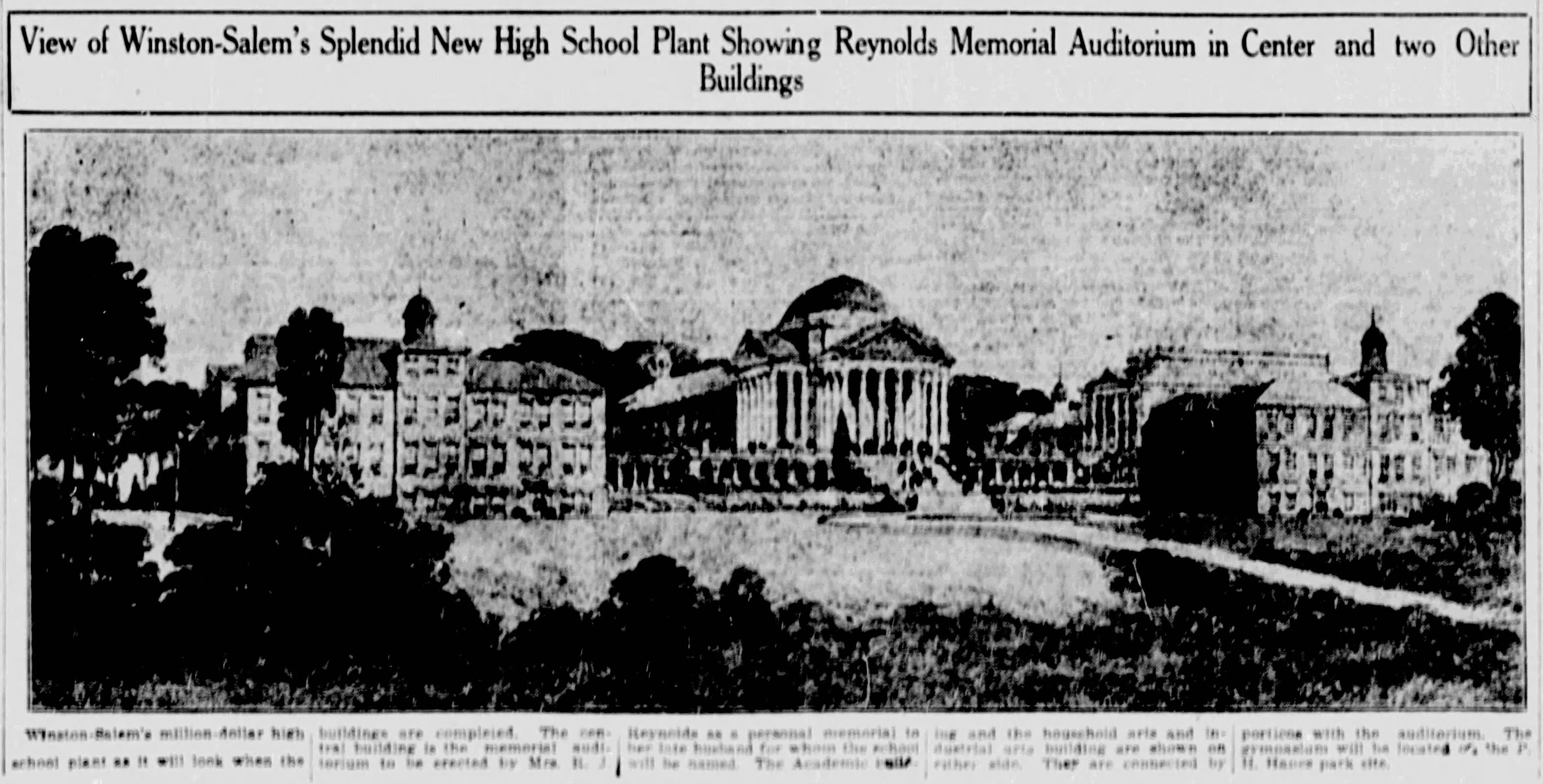
Early rendering of the school buildings and auditorium. December, 28th, 1919

The towns of Winston and Salem combined to form a single city in 1913. By the time Hanes Park was founded in 1919, the Charlotte News and Observer noted that "Winston-Salem" was "an industrious city, with widely diversified industries, although tobacco and textiles form the principal interests." The city could "rightfully claim to be the industrial center of the State," and along with the growth of Wachovia bank, by the 1920s Winston-Salem had grown to be the largest city in the State of North Carolina. Within the city, much of that growth expanded outwards from Hanes Park.

R. J. Reynolds owned much of the land bordering the West End Dairy farm, and following his death in 1918; a decision was made. His widow, Katherine Reynolds, who "took on numerous civic and social responsibilities in her time," in conjunction and conditioned with Hanes' gift, donated 25 acres of adjacent land to the City of Winston-Salem to be used as grounds for a new school. This donation also included an auditorium, whereby both would sit on the hill overlooking Hanes Park. In all, the plan for the Park, Auditorium, High School, Gymnasium, Middle School and a vocational school were entered into an initial landscape design titled "Winston School Park" by Landscape Engineer (Architect) Louis L. Miller of Somerville, NJ; who was in the employ of P. H. Hanes Sr. The vocational school was never built, and following a successful bond referendum and completion of construction; Richard J. Reynolds High School opened for its first semester in January 1923.

The initial announcement of the donations was made on Friday morning, July 4, 1919. "At a special meeting of the Board of Aldermen...three handsome donations were tendered to the City...combining into the foundation of one of the handsomest and most complete high school, park, and recreation properties in the South." "It will carry full recreation equipment...a half mile field of day track, baseball, tennis and game grounds,...fully equipped." The gifted properties were "to be used as the site of a high school, industrial vocational school and park, to be known as P. H. Hanes Park. Mrs. Reynolds will give 25 acres of land adjoining the tract of Hanes and also build an auditorium seating several thousand people in memory of R. J. Reynolds." The Winston-Salem Journal proclaimed that "a Magnificent Park, Playground and High School Site and Beautiful Auditorium" had been "assured for the City." Dr. Frank Bachman of the Southern Educational Board, who had been in Winston-Salem at the time, was called upon by the Mayor to speak at the Board of Aldermen meeting. He remarked that:

"The splendid gift to this city is not only a great honor to the city, but speaks volumes to the broad-mindedness and forethought of the donors. They have laid the foundation of one of the finest high school plants in the South. This magnificent gift opens the door of opportunity to generation after generation to come. This is a great occasion, a great opportunity, a great gift. I'm sure that the people of the city will rise to meet it."

Following the announcement, word of the donations spread throughout the State, and the cities of Raleigh, Greensboro, and Charlotte sent notes of thanks to the donors. The letters of donation from Reynolds and Hanes were reprinted on the front pages of the Twin City Sentinel and the Winston-Salem Journal. In his letter, Hanes outlined the proper conditions for the donation of Hanes Park, one of which was, "That this property be beautified and forever maintained and kept up by the City of Winston-Salem."

Neighborhood expansion from Hanes Park

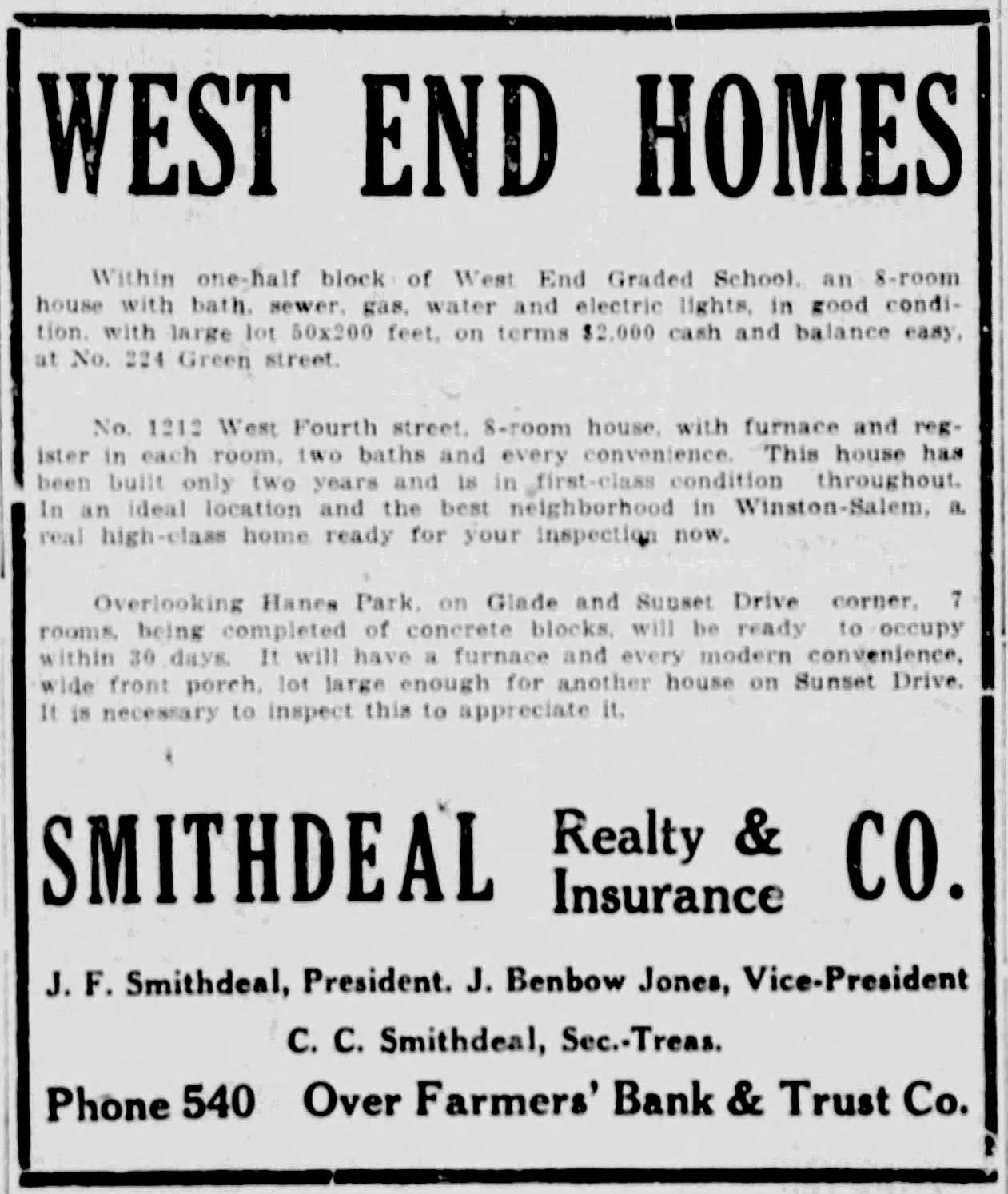
West End neighborhood homes around "new" Hanes Park. Winston-Salem Journal, November 1, 1919

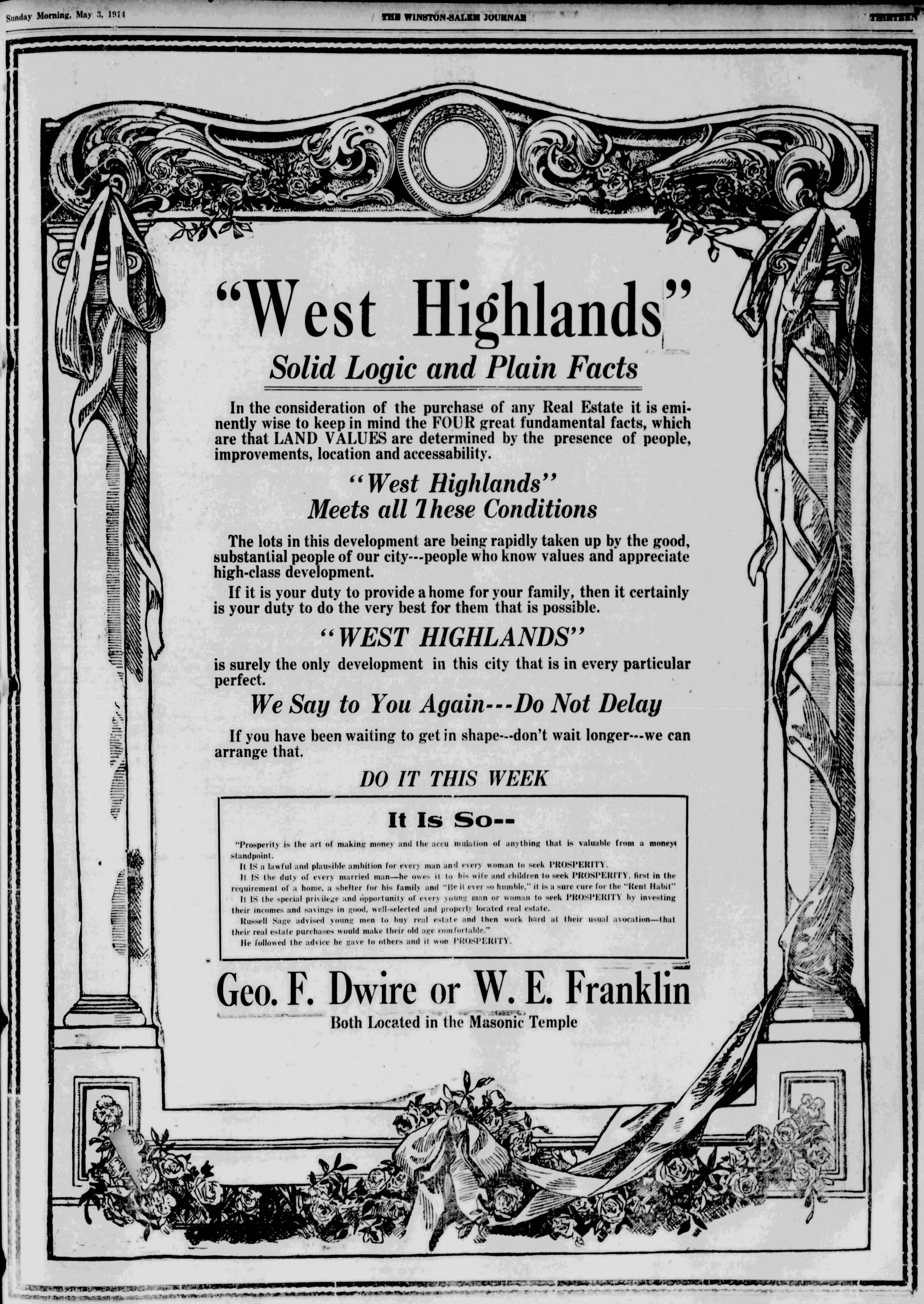
Early West Highlands neighborhood around Hanes Park. Winston-Salem Journal, June 7, 1914

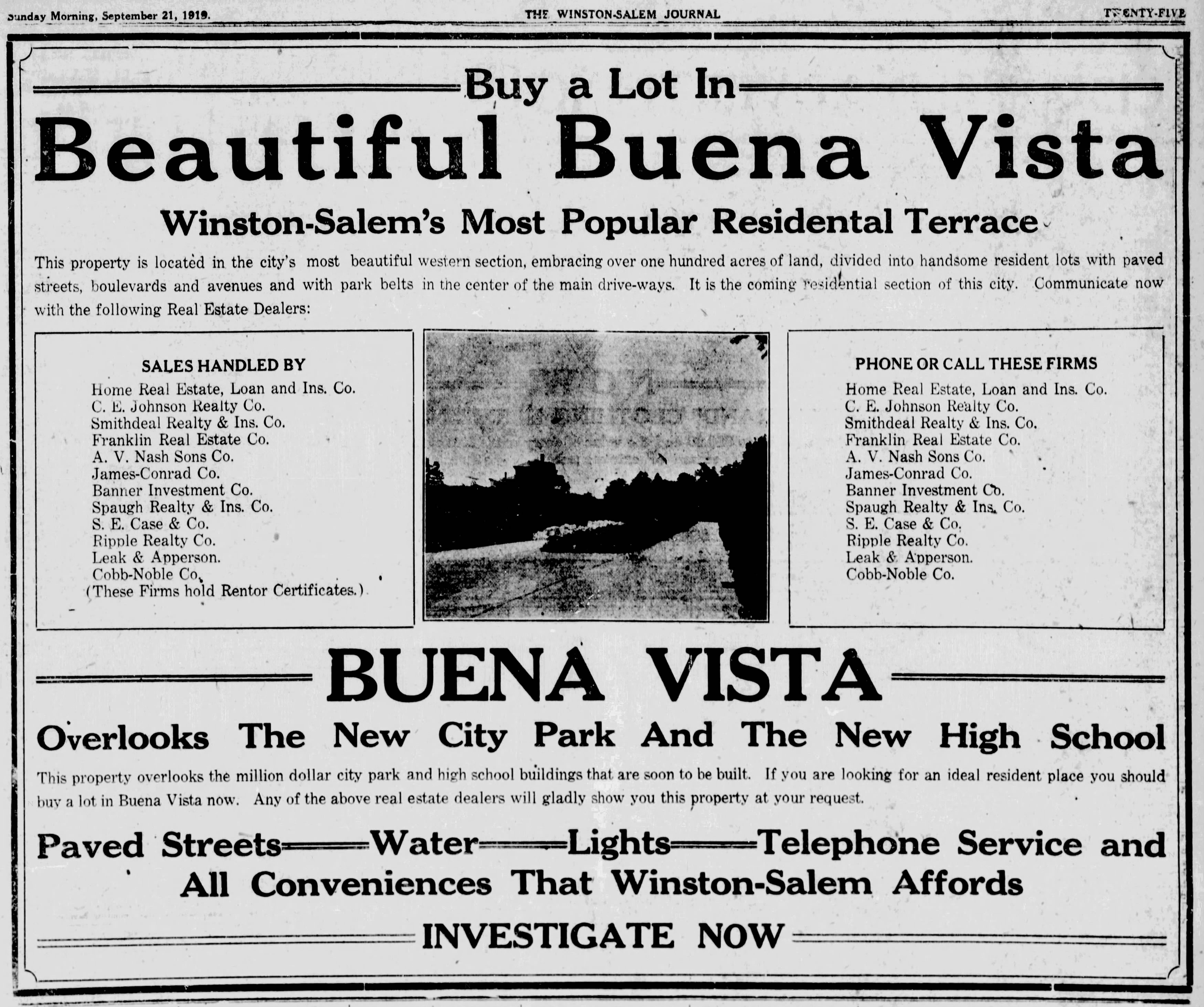
Buena Vista neighborhood expansion westward from Hanes Park. Winston-Salem Journal, September 21, 1919

==== The John Wesley Hanes donation ====
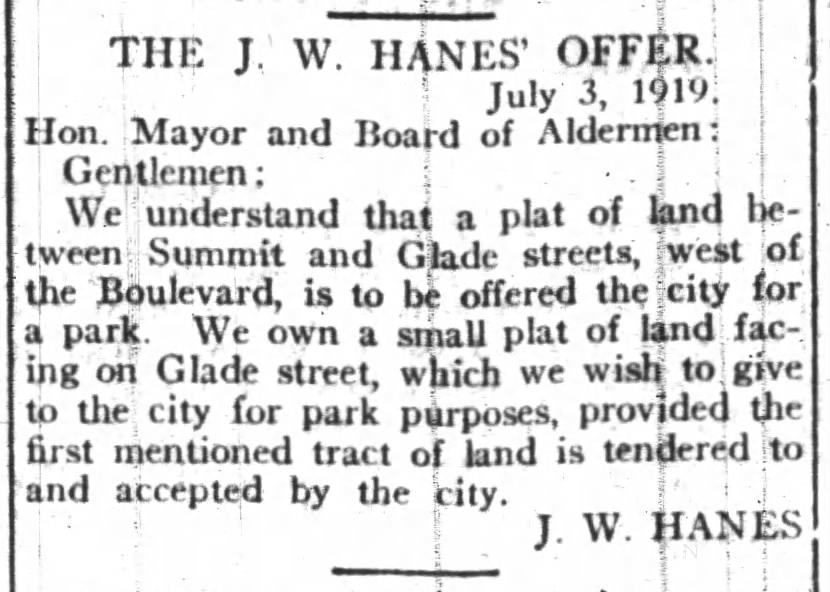
Union Republican newspaper, July 10, 1919

Three donations were made in the Summer of 1919. The first was the gift of P. H. Hanes Sr., the second from Katherine Reynolds, and the third from John Wesley Hanes II. At the time of donation, Pleasant Henderson Hanes, Sr. was 74. His Nephew John Wesley II, son of his late brother "Wes," was 27. In a letter to the City of Winston-Salem (mentioned in other papers but only reprinted in the Union Republican), acting on behalf of his late father's estate, John Wesley Hanes II stated that, "We own a small tract of land facing on Glade Street, which we wish to give to the City for park purposes,..." This offer was accepted by the City, and comprised the third "magnificent" gift.

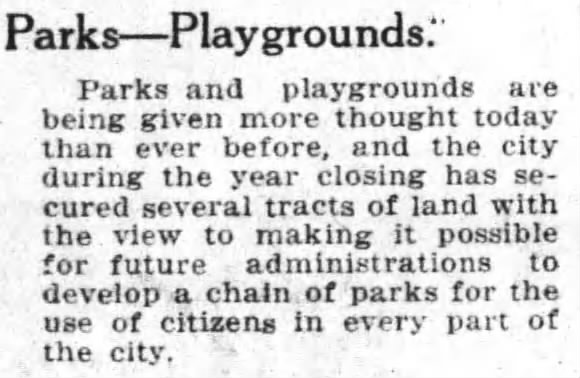
The founding of Hanes Park marked the beginning of the park system in the City of Winston-Salem. Western Sentinel newspaper, December 30th, 1919

===== Glade Street lake =====
Also of note is an early plan for "Winston School Park," that entailed the damming of "Peters Brook," and the creation of an artificial lake at the bottom of Glade Street. This proposed 6-acre lake, would have put the corner of what is now First Street and Hawthorne Road (location of the current BP) under water, and given lake frontage to Baptist Hospital (completed in 1923) and Hanes Park. Although never realized, in discussing the proposed land on August 14, 1919, the Winston-Salem Journal reported that "It is capable of the highest landscape development and has three freshwater streams on it which will make possible a large freshwater lake in the future for boating and swimming in the summer and skating in the winter, just below the Glade Street Bridge."

=== Notable events ===
==== Death of Leo Caldwell ====
Hanes Park has been the home of R. J. Reynolds High School athletics since the beginning, and that includes the time honored tradition of football. Rooted in the Ivy League schools of the late 19th century, traditional games in the 1920s often pitted high school teams from local towns/cities against one another. A star player's name might make the paper in the next town over, with glowing descriptions of his talents and abilities on the field. Sadly the same can also be said of a loss, and on Saturday October 20, 1923, a great loss had to be reported.

Leo Caldwell was a star athlete and a Junior at R. J. Reynolds High School. He was Captain of both the football and basketball teams. The son of the regional manager for the Standard Oil company, Leo was a scholar and a popular student. "He was gifted in that he could forget himself and think of others. It was this trait of character that made him so wonderful in team work." In addition to his character, "His skill, courage and impetuosity made him one of the most promising athletes of his age in the state."

Punts existed in football at the time, but the position of Punter had not been invented yet. The best athlete on the team often got the job, and the best athlete at Reynolds was Leo Caldwell. Following his own kick, Caldwell chased down the Charlotte team captain who had sifted through his teammates. Leo "plunged" at him and made the tackle, saving the game winning touchdown in the process. He did not get up. At the time, minimal protection from safety equipment meant that broken teeth and facial lacerations were a common part of the game. In Leo's case, that lack of protection cost him his life.

The death of Leo Caldwell was a shock to many. The newspaper at nearby Salem College called for the sport of football to be banned, while the Winston-Salem Journal lamented that "Leo Caldwell would not have had the game he loved abandoned for all time here." The Winston-Salem Foundation was a well established institution at the time. Following an anonymous letter to the Twin City Sentinel newspaper urging people to contribute, the Foundation assumed management of the Leo Caldwell fund, and "hundreds of young people who might not have had a shot at a college education have benefited directly from Leo Caldwell's final act."

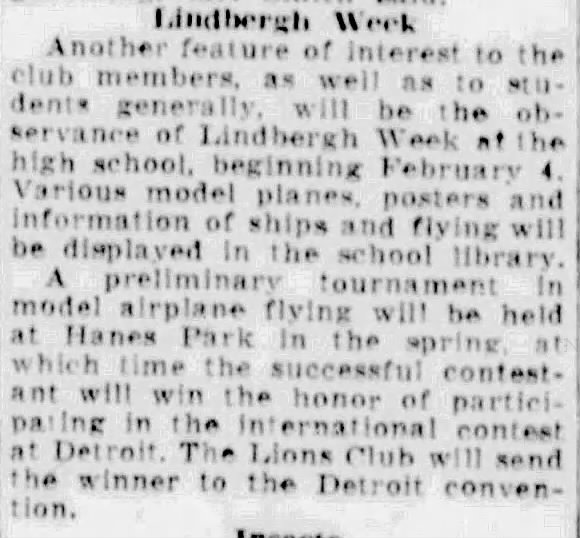
Winston-Salem Journal, January 23, 1929

==== Visit from Charles Lindbergh ====
On May 20-21st, 1927, Colonel Charles Lindbergh became the first pilot to fly solo across the Atlantic Ocean. On October 14th of that year, it was hoped he would fly a "special demonstration" over Hanes Park in his plane the "Spirit of St. Louis." The special flight never quite materialized, but he did make a landing at Miller Field, where he began his journey to Hanes Park. "The visit of Colonel Lindbergh brought out one of the largest crowds that has ever visited Winston-Salem. There were throngs at the airport, at Hanes Park, at the hotel, and all along the streets through which the official party passed." Once at the Park, Lindbergh made a brief speech. These remarks, as reported by the Twin City Sentinel, were "especially for the children."

==== Bill Tilden ====
On Saturday May 27, 1933, tennis champion Bill Tilden played an exhibition match in Hanes Park. Tilden was the first American to win Wimbledon, and had won 7 US Open titles by the time of his visit. As recalled by the Salem College newspaper at the time, "Tilden played in dazzling form, using both his forearm and backhand drives with equal success. His famous cannon-ball service and his chopping were brilliant to watch, as well as his spectacular placements." "Although the matches were unavoidably delayed for almost an hour, the audience immediately forgot the hot, tiresome wait when Big Bill finally stepped out upon the court." Overall, it was reported that the exhibition match had been "excellent entertainment."

==== Works Progress Administration ====
George W. Coan, Mayor of Winston-Salem since 1929, was appointed the first administrator of the Works Progress Administration (WPA) in North Carolina in 1935. A former tobacco executive, Coan worked closely with federal and local officials to bring projects into the city. These projects included a large sanitary sewer project, as well as such tasks as the removal of 40+year-old streetcar tracks; the "car line" as it was referred to at the time. The very last of these tracks to be removed in the city were on Glade Street adjacent to Hanes Park in 1938. The original car line station serving West Highlands, Hanes Park, and Reynolds High School was at the corner of Hawthorne Road and Northwest Boulevard, south of the old Southern Railway tracks on the right side, next to what is today the "TRAFFIC CIRCLE" sign. Following the station's removal, the area was considered for commercial redevelopment. Residents around nearby Runnymeade Park at the time did not approve of the proposals. Today the area serves as a reserve parking lot.

==== Death of Brantley Moss ====
One WPA project in Hanes Park involved installing revetment stones, recessed down several sections of the Peters Creek bed. It was while working on that project that tragedy struck:

"Brantley Moss, 74, WPA worker, was instantly killed when he was crushed between 2 trucks while working on the terracing project near Richard J. Reynolds High School. Police said a truck was being loaded with dirt by a crew of workmen, including Moss. A second truck owned by the city of Winston-Salem and driven by a city employee, was backing into a position where it could be loaded. The rear of the truck...crushed Moss between the side of the other truck, injuring him internally. He died instantly."

The death of Brantley Moss created a legal controversy. Masten Hawkes, Moss' fellow worker who had been driving the truck, was acquitted of manslaughter charges following the incident. He had been driving a truck owned by the city of Winston-Salem, while working under the supervision of the WPA. Moss had died intestate without family, nevertheless a lawsuit led to Shapiro v. City of Winston-Salem, which helped establish clearer guidelines within city responsibilities after the North Carolina Supreme Court determined that responsibility for the accident resided with the WPA, not the City of Winston-Salem.

==== National Football League ====
From the years 1955 to 1960, the Green Bay Packers and the Washington Redskins (today Commanders) played a September preseason game at Bowman Gray Stadium in Winston-Salem. While the Packers trained in the neighboring city of Greensboro, in 1955 the Redskins would "work out at the Reynolds High School field at Hanes Park." Subsequent years saw the workouts move to Wake Forest University, but in the first year it was decided to "pitch camp at Hanes Park" (and have their meals in the cafeteria at nearby Baptist hospital). On September 10, 1955, the Redskins defeated the Packers with a score of 33-31.

==== 9th Avenue Freeway controversy ====
In 1969, the city Winston-Salem caused a stir of controversy when they announced a plan for the "9th Avenue Freeway," a highway that would run through the middle of Hanes Park, in close proximity to R. J. Reynolds High School. The plan would have constructed a freeway from Cloverdale Avenue at the beginning of the Interstate 40 (now Salem Parkway) viaduct, roughly following below Northwest Boulevard (past the modern-day West End Opera House), and out to Highway 52 on the north side of the city.

Reaction to the announcement was swift and vitriolic. Some newspaper articles suggested that the route would save drivers "perhaps five minutes" and pointed to a plan for a new expressway on the south side of town (an idea that would later become modern I-40). Within weeks, "save-the-park" and "anti-highway" groups had formed, and resistance to the plan continued diligently throughout the middle of the year. In the end, the resistance movement got their wish as in October 1969 Highway Commissioner E. Gwyn McNeil stated publicly that "no state funds will be spent...on either planning or construction of a proposed expressway through Winston-Salem's Hanes Park."

== The park ==
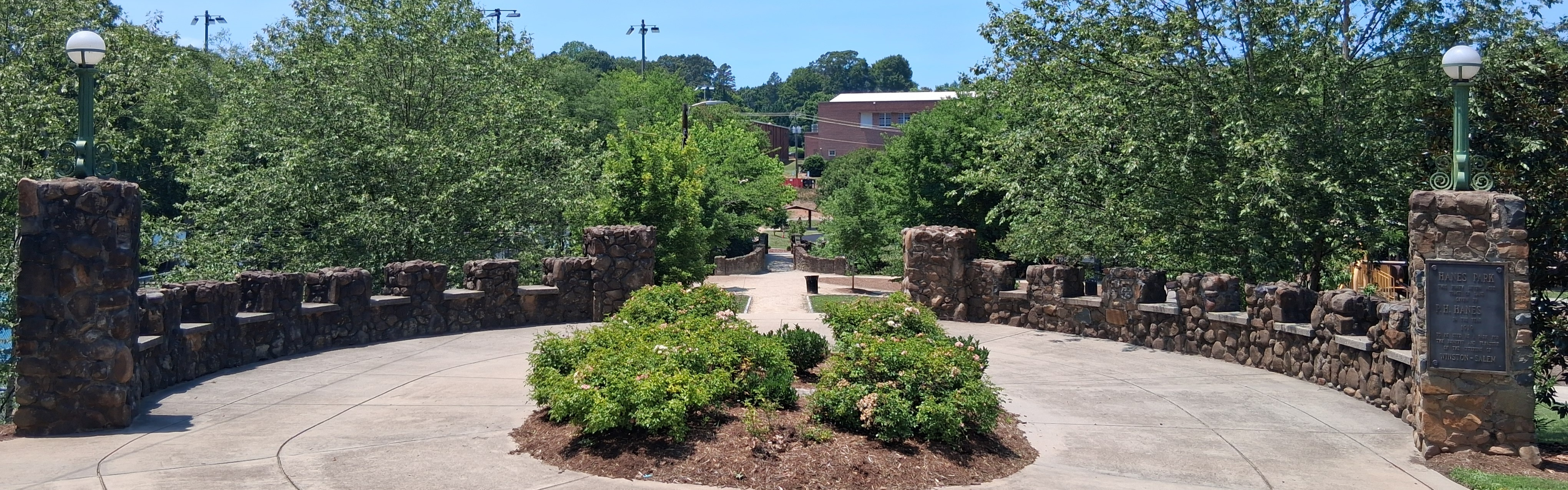
River cobble entrance to Hanes Park, 1934

The main entrance to Hanes Park is a monumental river cobble feature, consisting of 2, 7-foot pilasters anchoring a crenelated parapet set with protruding piers, which provides shaded seating under a river birch tree from the park side. An obround plaza with a central garden of oval shape, is adjoined to a grand set of splayed steps, lined with cheek walls flared to protruding base piers leading out into the playground. The entrance was completed in 1934.

Hanes Park amenities include a playground, 20 lighted tennis courts, (14 clay and 6 hard surface), 2 open play fields, a ¼ mile (400 meter) all-weather running track and a 1.1 mile walking trail along Peters Creek. It is also home to R. J. Reynolds High School tennis, football, softball, track and field, and baseball.

=== Joe White tennis center ===
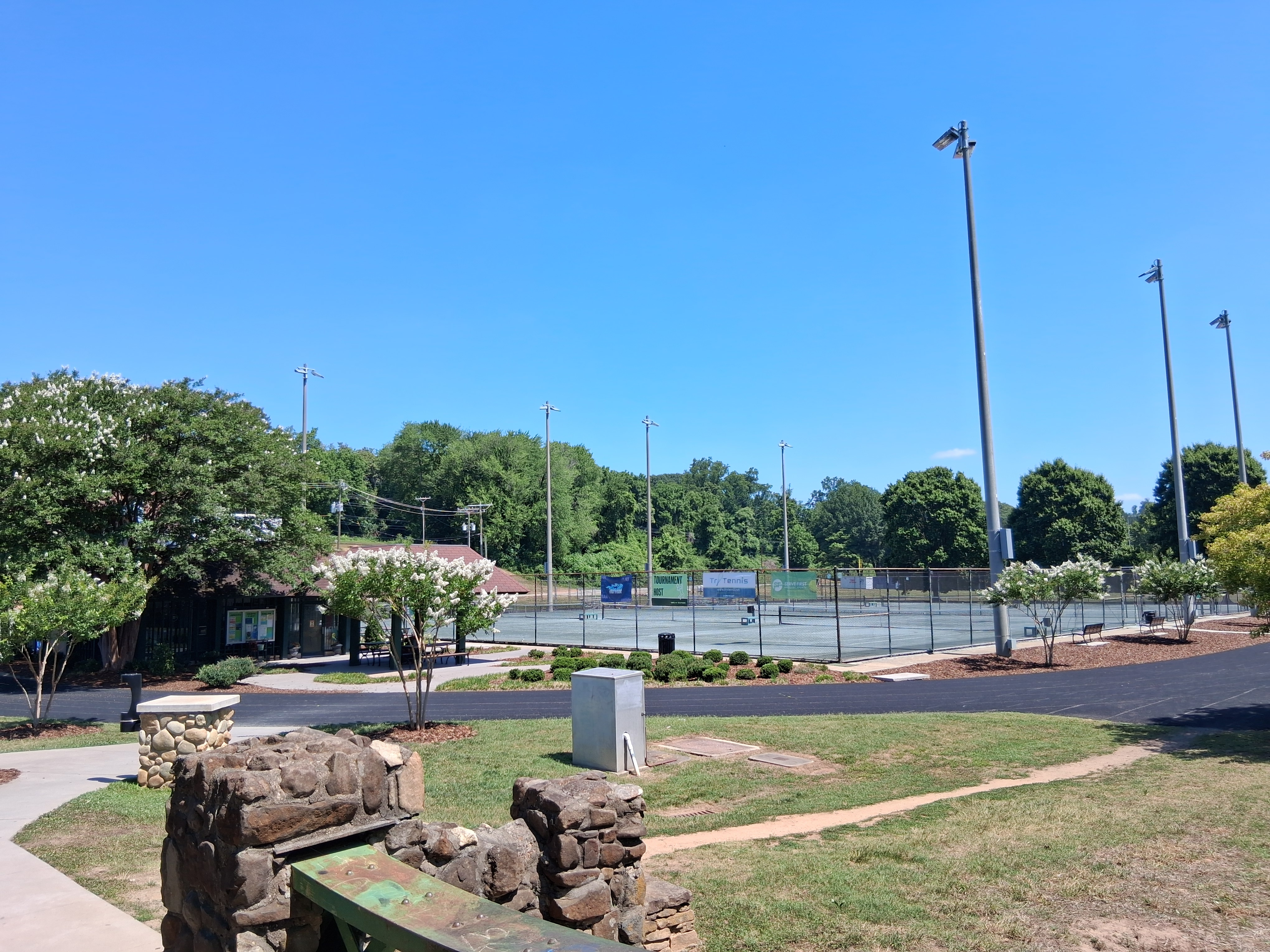
Tennis center & Clay courts

Tennis activities in Hanes Park are largely handled through the Joe White tennis center, named for the former director of parks and recreation of the same name. Winston-Salem Tennis, Inc. donated the building in 1989, which today features a pro shop, shaded seating, and serves as an office for tennis lessons, tournaments, and other gatherings.

=== Bob Sosnik track ===
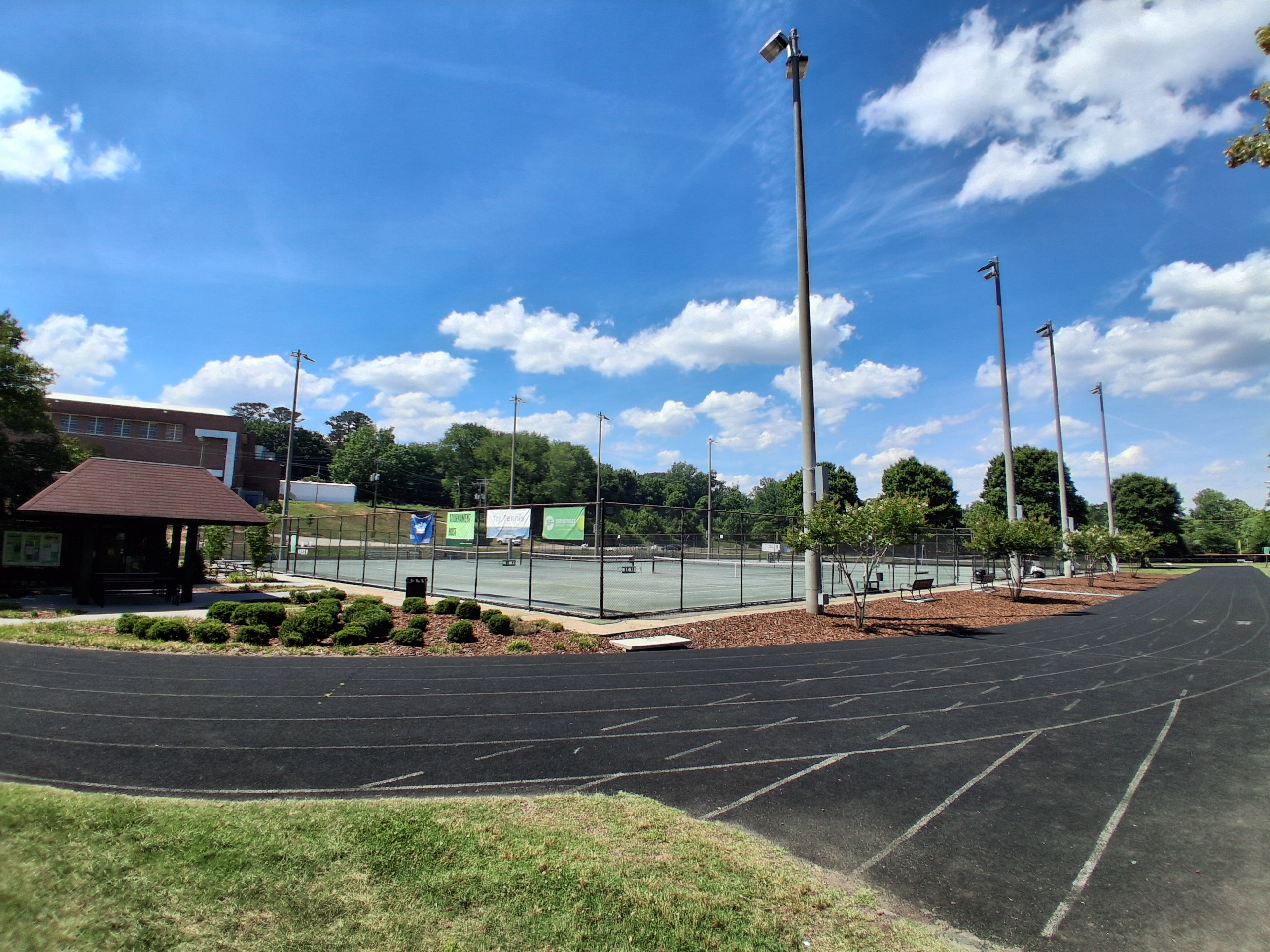
The Bob Sosnik track, 2026

The ¼ mile (400 meter) all-weather "tartan" track in Hanes Park is named for Dr. Robert Sosnik, editor of the famed Twin City Track Club Flyer newsletter from 1986 to 2003. Sosnik's work was published nationally in Runners World magazine and he himself was known to be an avid runner, whose amusing "Bobservations" drew interest from a great many readers. The "Bob Sosnik Track" was dedicated following his passing in 2007.

=== John Tandy athletic field ===
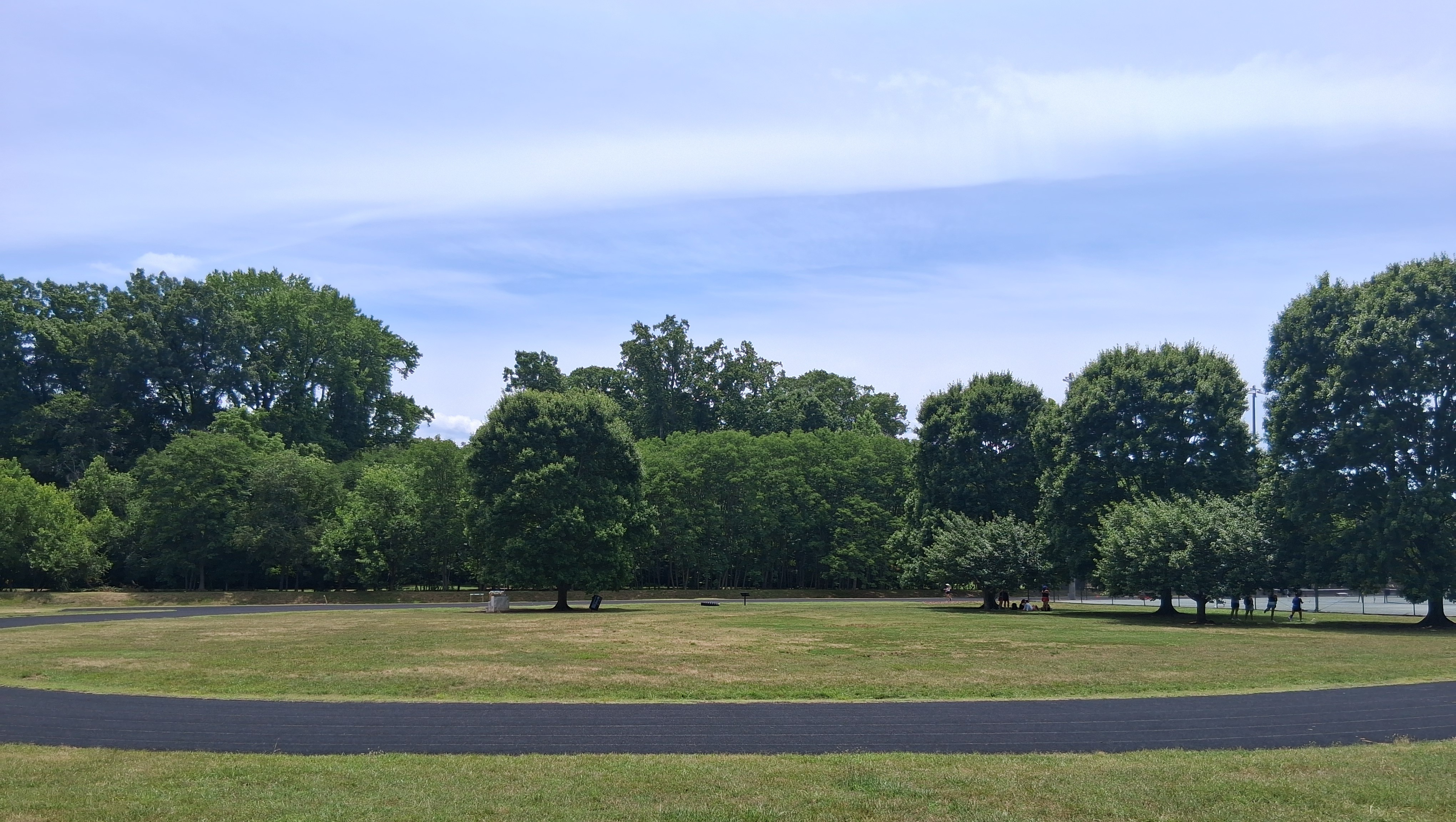
John Tandy athletic field. The Bob Sosnik plaque can be seen at center

The athletic field at the north end of Hanes Park is named for former Reynolds High School Athletics Director and Head football Coach John Hargreaves Tandy. A graduate of the University of North Carolina at Chapel Hill, Tandy led R. J. Reynolds High School football to their first State Championship in 1952. That team was co-captained by future Reynolds High School Head football Coach and stadium namesake Doug Crater.

=== M. Douglas Crater field and stadium ===
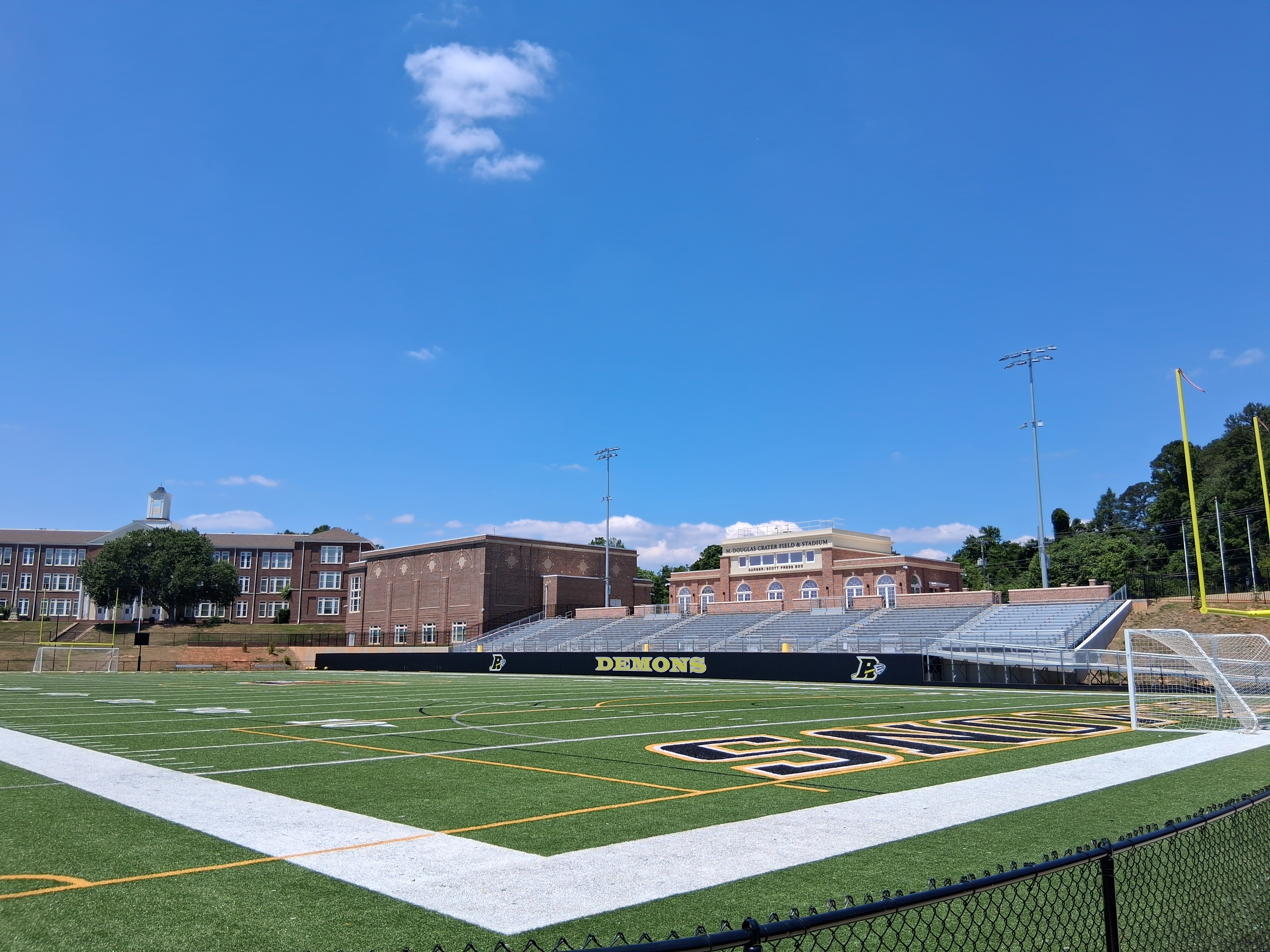
M. Douglas Crater Field and Stadium, 2026

On August 22, 2025, the first game was played at M. Douglas Crater Field and Stadium. "The Crater," as it has become known, sits centered on the north side of Hanes Park. It was named for Reynolds High School Hall of Fame inductee M. Douglas Crater. A Reynolds High School scholar, Crater finished graduate work at Appalachian State University before returning to educate and coach R. J. Reynolds' football for 36 years.

The impact of "the Crater" was felt in the West End Neighborhood. Initial response to the announcement of the new stadium drew the ire of some residents, who wished for Hanes Park to retain more of its natural charm. Some felt that the line between bucolic serenity and contemporary athletics that has always defined Hanes Park, had been crossed. Others see the stadium as a natural fit to an area that has always been home to Reynolds High School athletics. Regardless of opinions, Hanes Park remains a vibrant center of activity for the City of Winston-Salem.

=== Twin City Track Club (TCTC) events ===
The Twin City Track Club often hosts races and other events at the Bob Soznik track. They are the Hanes Park sponsor for the City of Winston-Salem's "Adopt-A-Park" program under the City's "Keep Winston-Salem Beautiful" initiative. Four times per year, the Club organizes a Volunteer Day to clean the trash out of Hanes Park and Peters Creek. Volunteer information can be found here.

=== Restorations ===
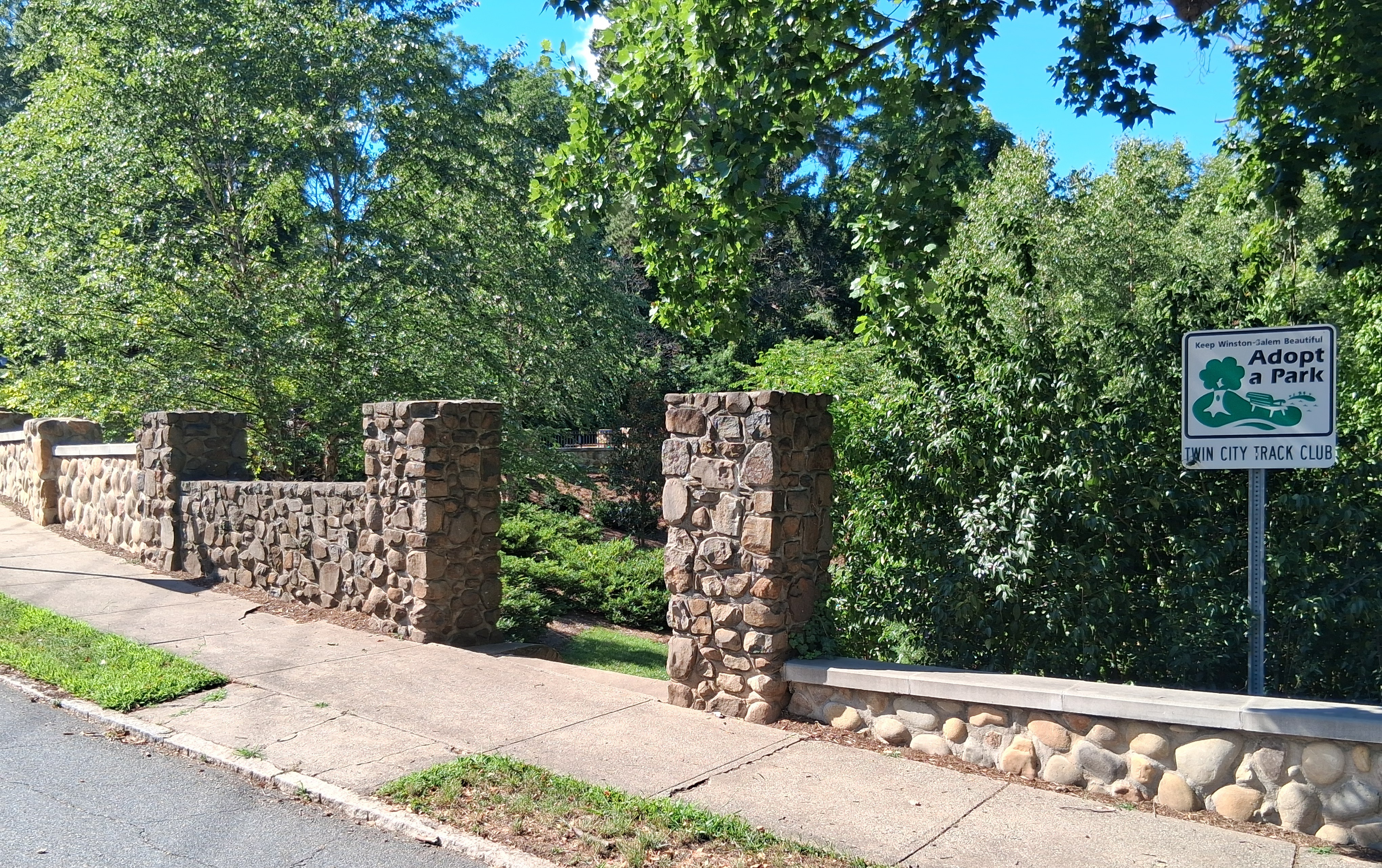
Original SW entry markers and wall section, c.1933

==== 2019 centennial restoration ====
In 2019 following a successful bond referendum, Hanes Park underwent a $2,200,000 restoration to celebrate its 100 Year Anniversary. Improvements included a new playground, restoration of the cobble entrance, new seating for the tennis courts, new dugouts for the baseball diamond, as well as the replacement and addition of various stone steps, walls and other landscape features. The original river cobble landscape features (constructed from 1931 to 1934) such as the gateway sign at the corner of Glade Street and Sunset, as well as the steps on Sunset Drive, were left intact in their original state where feasible. Extensive landscaping was also installed, with river birch and crape myrtle trees lining the playground and tennis courts. Other shrubs included azaleas, gardenias, and Lady Banks roses as well as redbud and dogwood trees.

==== 1991 to 1994 restoration ====
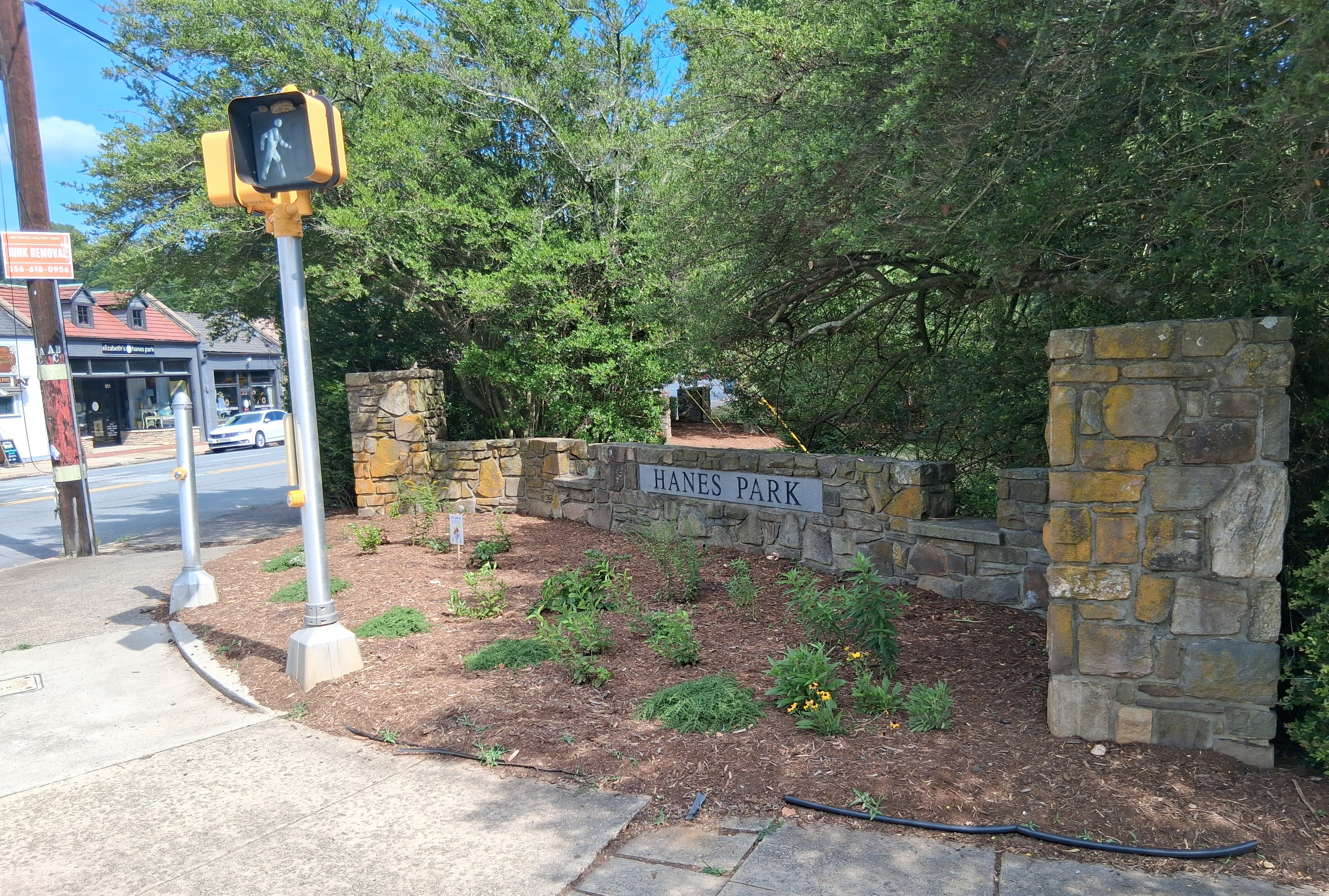
Hanes Park NW gateway sign, early 1990's restoration

The 2019 project represented the third major restoration of Hanes Park in its 100-year history. In addition to the extensive work completed in the 1930s, a second project was conceived in 1989 and later brought to life in the early 1990s. In part this project entailed the use of granite armor and filter stones for the revetment and grading of the Peters Creek banks; on which erosion had taken a considerable toll. Landscape improvements included the replacement of the central portion of the SE corner gateway sign, the addition of a fifth foot bridge over Peters Creek on the north side of the Park near West End Boulevard, as well as a new granite "Hanes Park" gateway sign at the corner of Northwest Boulevard and Reynolda Road. That corner was also enhanced by the construction of entrance markers or "piers," as well as a set of granite entry steps, leading down to the area that was originally the parking lot for the baseball field.

==== Daniel Boone monument ====
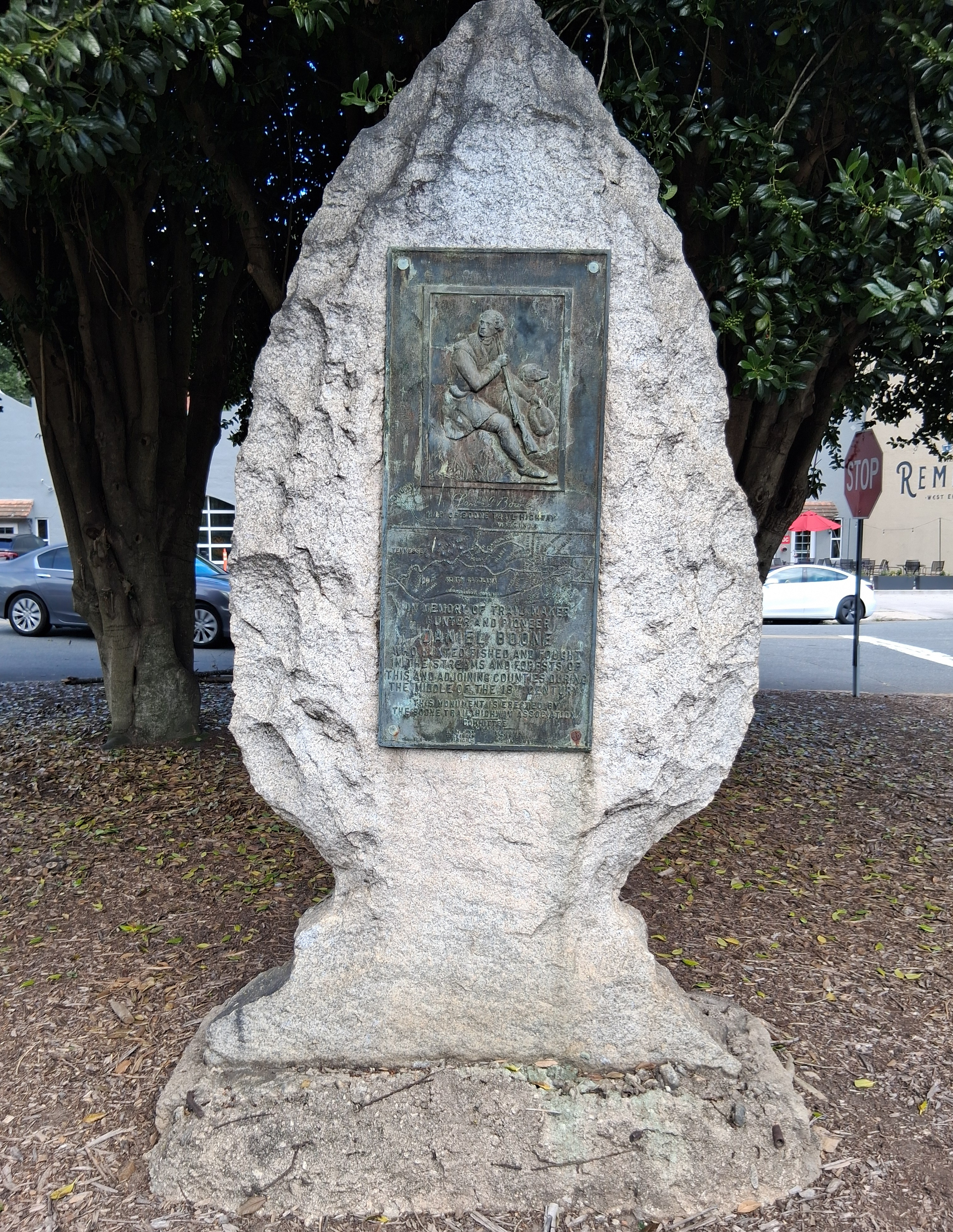
Daniel Boone monument, NE corner of Hanes Park

At the northeast corner of Hanes Park, situated in a traffic island on West End Boulevard at Summit Street, sits a monument to Daniel Boone. Dedicated in 1927, it is a six-foot monolith, carved from granite and in the shape of an arrowhead, on which is set a bronze plaque. The image is of Daniel Boone seated with his dog and rifle, and displays roads leading north and northwest out of Winston-Salem. Also included is a facsimile of his signature. The monument is inscribed:

"In Memory of Trail Marker

Hunter and Pioneer
Daniel Boone
Who hunted, fished and fought
in the streams and forests of
this and adjoining counties during

the middle of the 18th century"

Legend has it that Daniel Boone began his journey in Salem, with the purchase of gunpowder at the general store. The monument itself was erected through the work of J. Hampton Rich of Winston-Salem, who founded the Boone Highway Trail and Memorial Association to promote the expansion of roads and highways in Western North Carolina. Hundreds of steel plaques were made, many of which still reside in pockets of U.S. towns and cities today. Winston-Salem's was the first to be cast, constructed in part from bronze salvage raised from the U.S.S. Maine. It is the only monument to feature Boone with both his dog and his rifle.

==== Southern Railway Charlotte line ====
Along Northwest Boulevard at the northwestern boundary running parallel to Hanes Park and between it and R. J. Reynolds High School, lies a single set of railway tracks dating from the 1870s. This line through Winston-Salem was taken out of commission on July 15, 1970, following a stop from a final passenger train that was en route between Greensboro and Asheville. The 1949 Recovery of the U. S. Coast and Geodetic Survey Benchmark Y42/1932 refers to these tracks as the "Charlotte Line of the Southern Railway." This railway line carried both passenger trains as well as freight, such as tobacco, textiles, and up until 1919; the West End Dairy Farm's Holstein Friesian cattle. Situated in close proximity to the city, steam locomotives would have moved slowly and with caution along these tracks. Steel beam through-girder bridges for the Line can be seen today at the southwestern and northwestern corners of Hanes Park; at the intersections of Northwest Boulevard with Hawthorne Road, as well as its intersection with Reynolda Road.

Charlotte Line of the Southern Railway

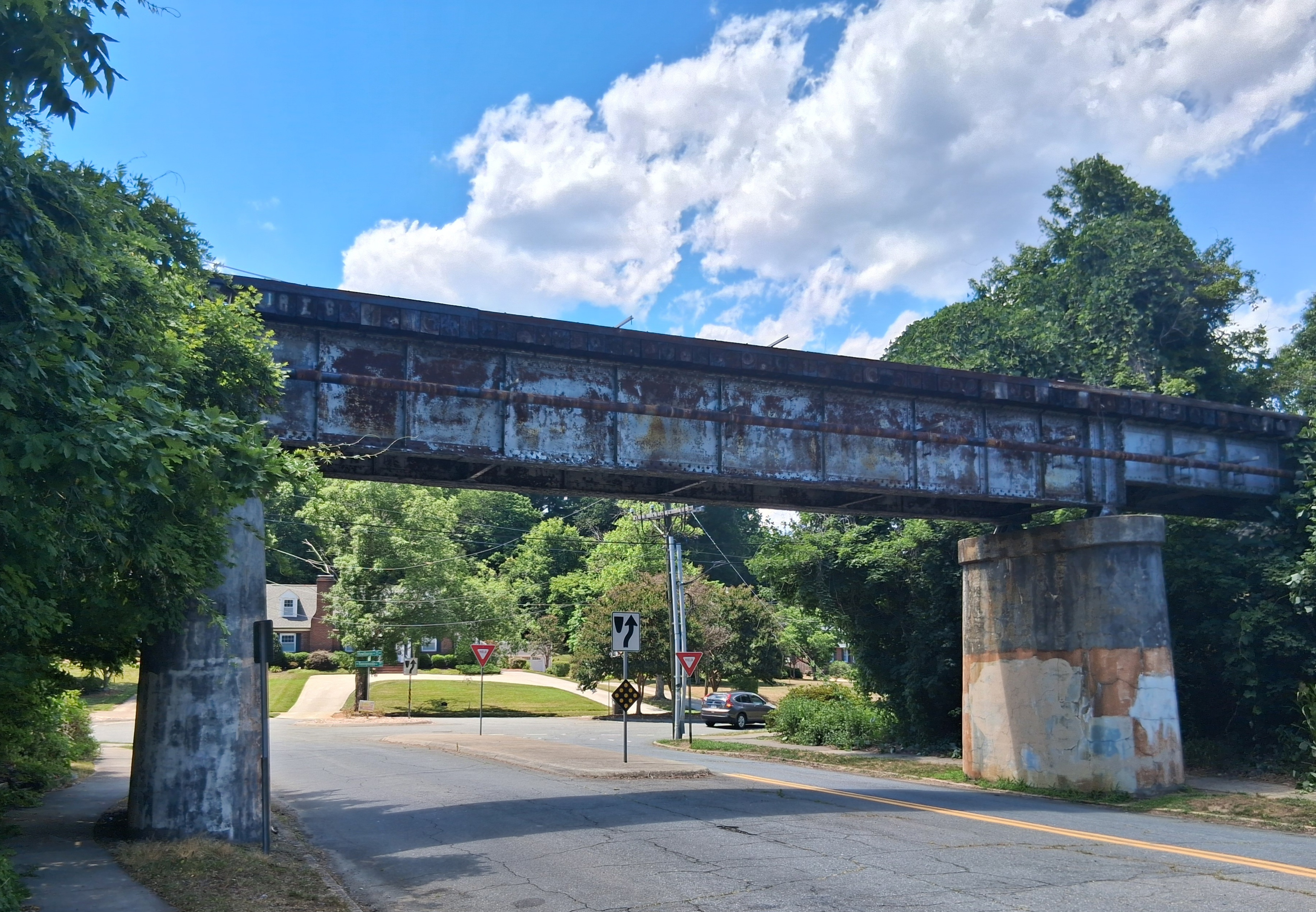
Over Hawthorne Road, 2026

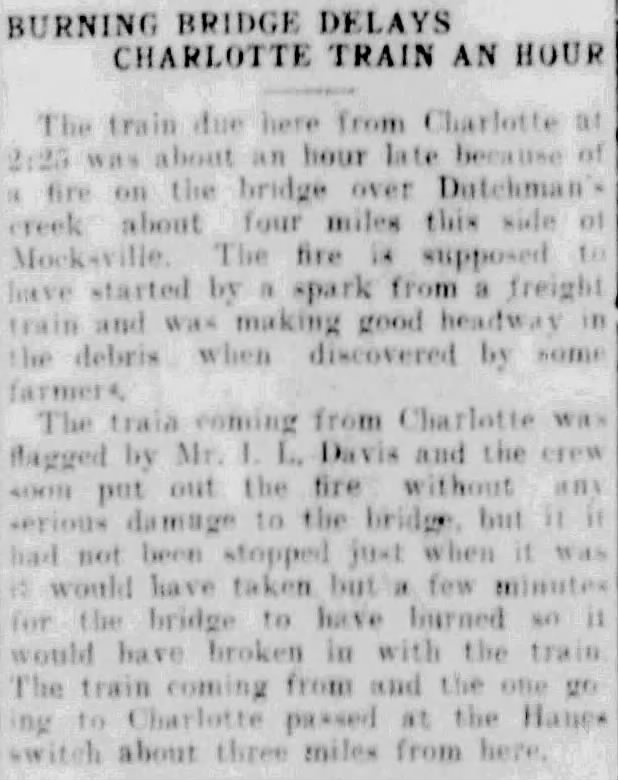
Winston-Salem Journal, April 7, 1910. Trouble with the Charlotte Line of the Southern Railway before it reached the "Hanes switch"

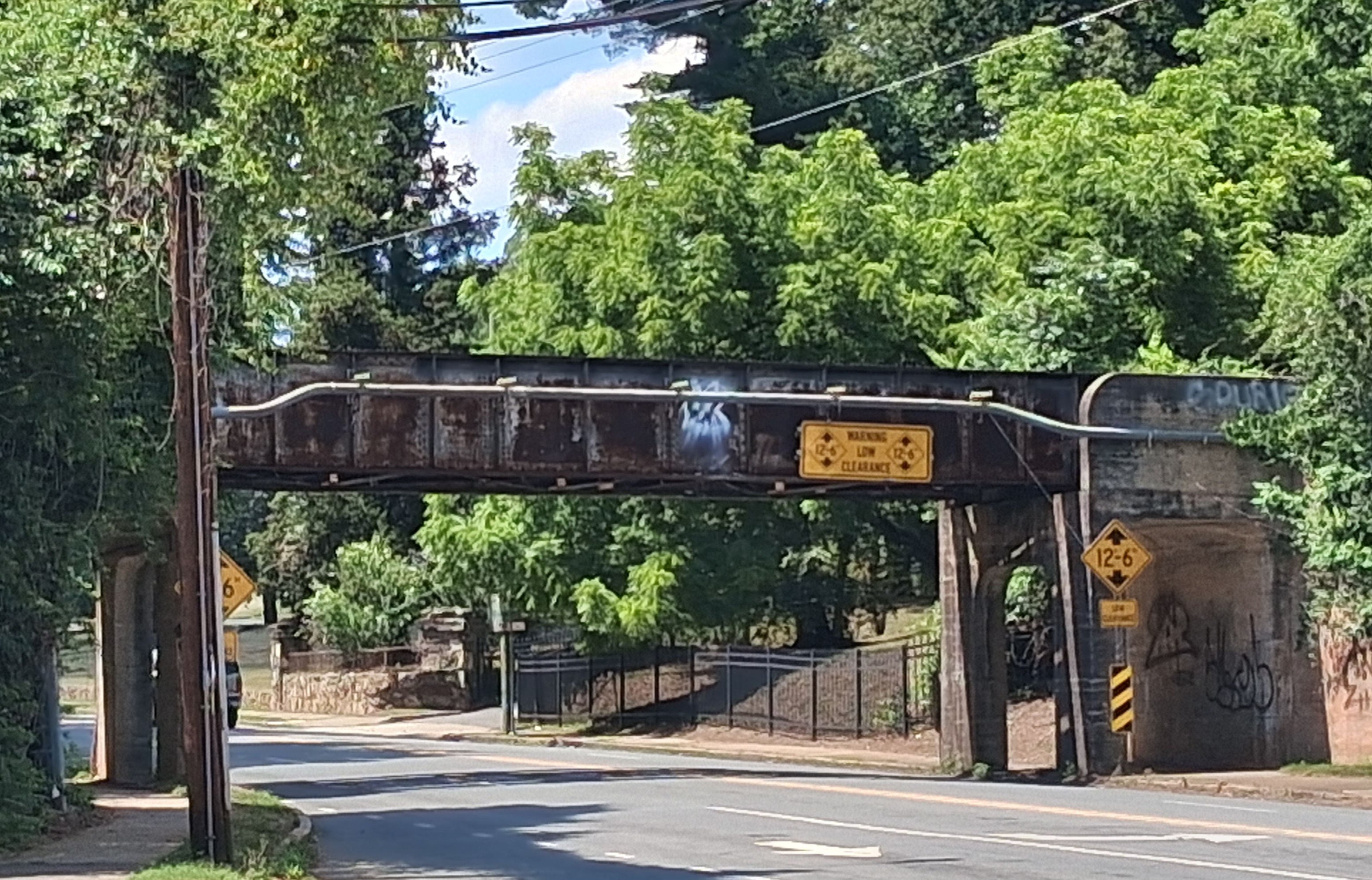
Over Reynolda Road, 2026

==== Ecosociety ====
Hanes Park has been a home to various animal species for many years. Up until 1927, "Peters Brook" was a shallow creek with banks akin to that of a lake. Small tributaries and streams ran throughout the Park, and it was those creeks and streams that watered the Holstein Friesian cattle of the West End Dairy Farm. However, diversion to culverts in the 1920s, dredging in the 1930s, along with lax environmental regulations in the mid 20th century, left Peters Creek in a sad and ecologically compromised state. This report from the Winston-Salem Journal on March 28, 1972, shows in part why the United States Clean Water Act (CWA) was a necessary piece of legislation:

"Peters Creek ran black through Hanes Park...The creek bed was loaded with tar-like sediment, and the water above was visibly oily. A smell something like that of kerosene was clearly detectable several feet from the banks...The black substance, which appeared to be like tar or low-grade fuel oil, was visible in the stream bed as far down as the point at which Peters Creek flows into a culvert at Interstate 40."

Water quality reports like that are becoming less frequent in the U.S. Today, the Hanes Park corridor of Peters Creek still supports some drainage in the City. By the year 2026, the implication and enforcement of greater environmental regulations, technological advances in wastewater management, greater public awareness, and the revision of antiquated and harmful policies; have revived Peters Creek from its state of 50 years ago.

==== Notable plaques in Hanes Park ====
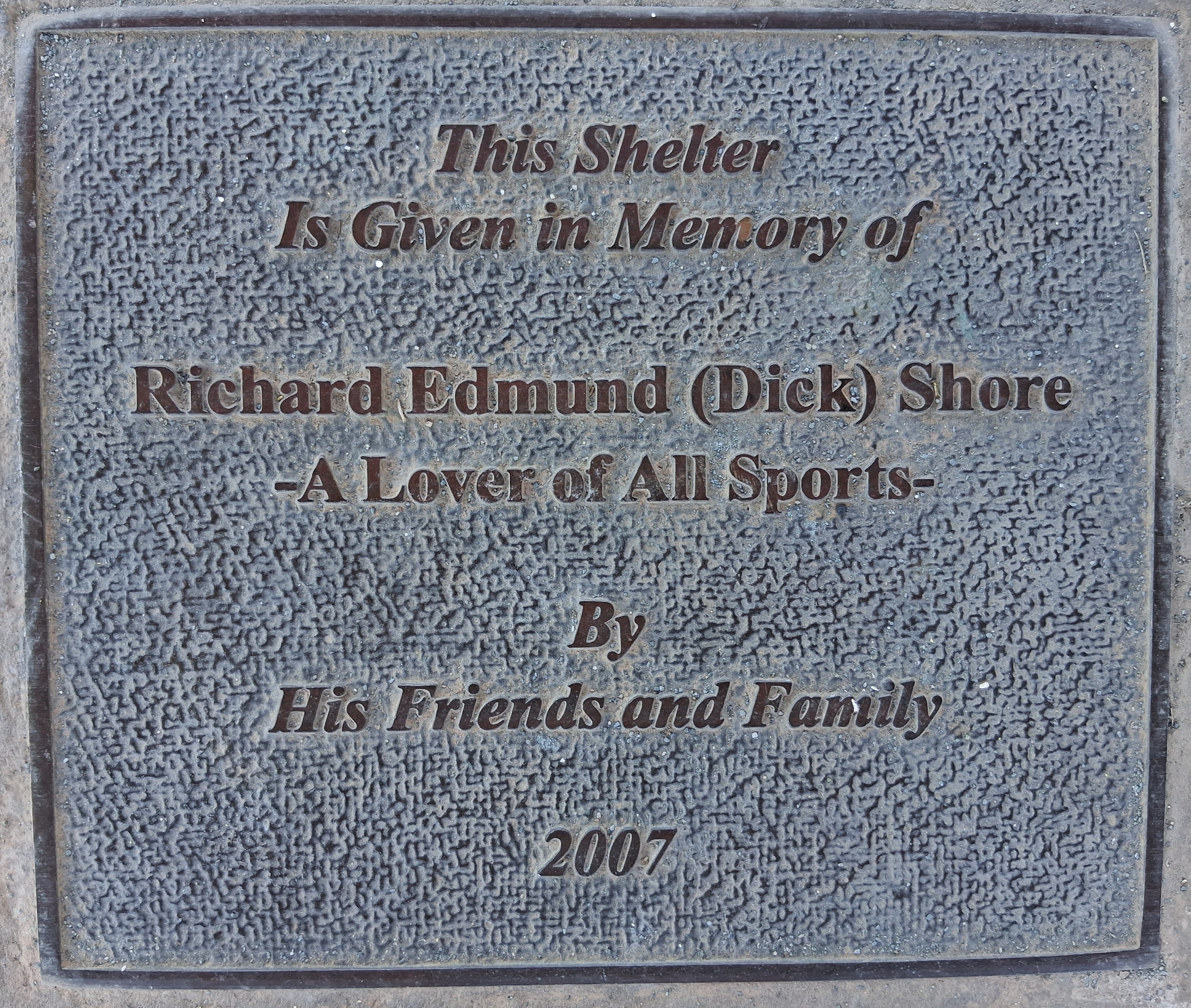
Central Hanes Park, 2026

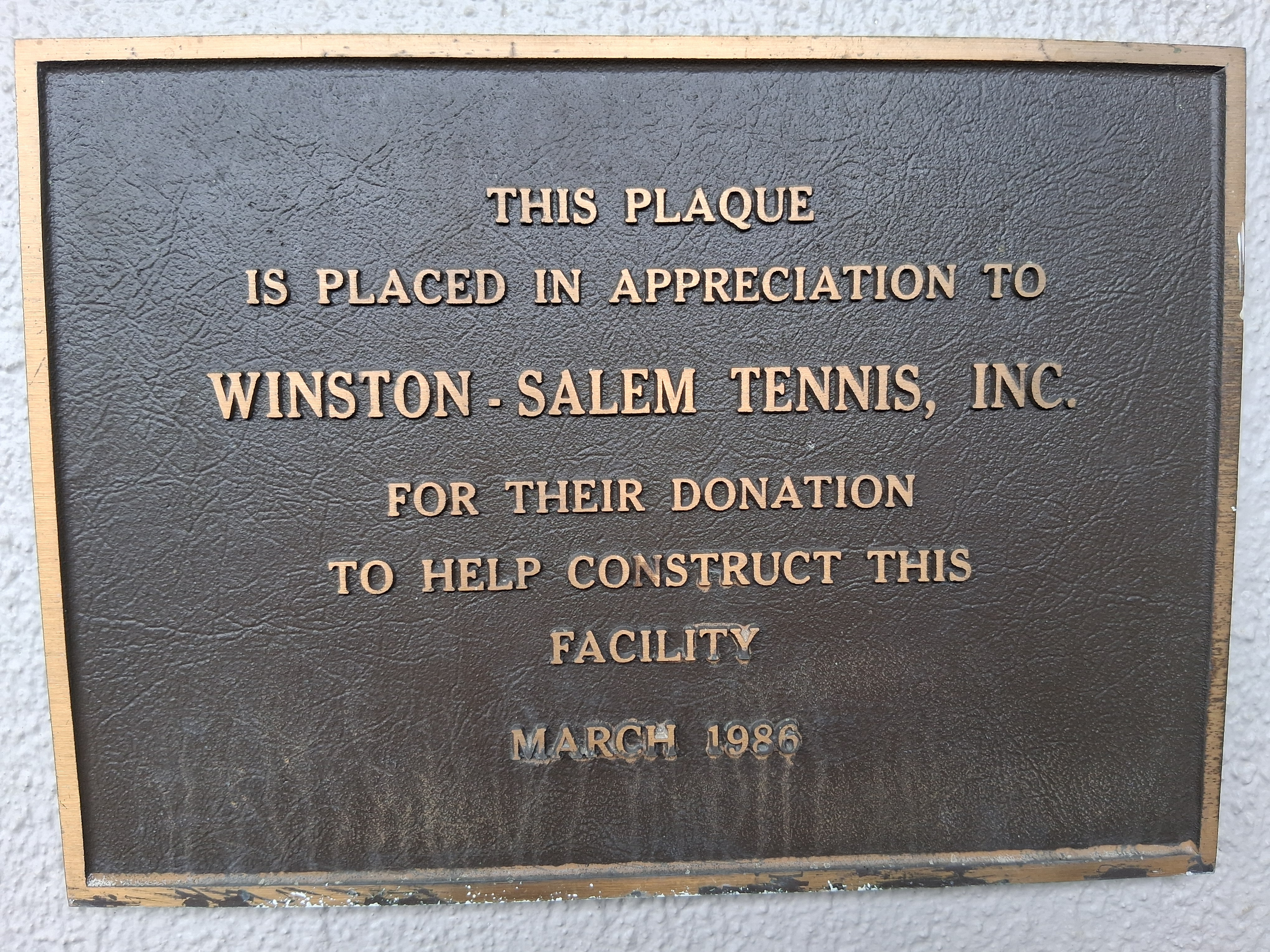
Central Hanes Park, 2026

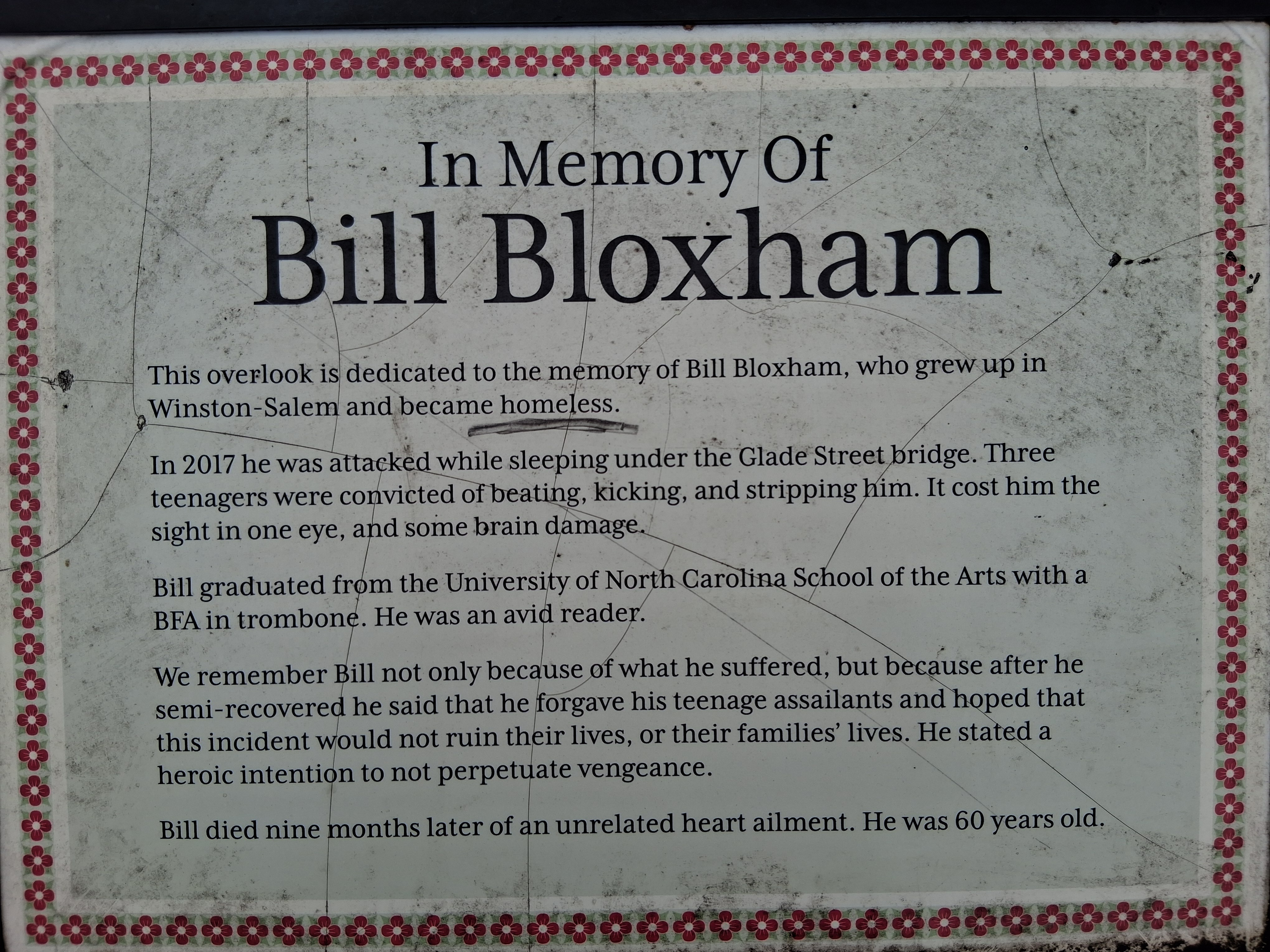
SW Hanes Park, 2026

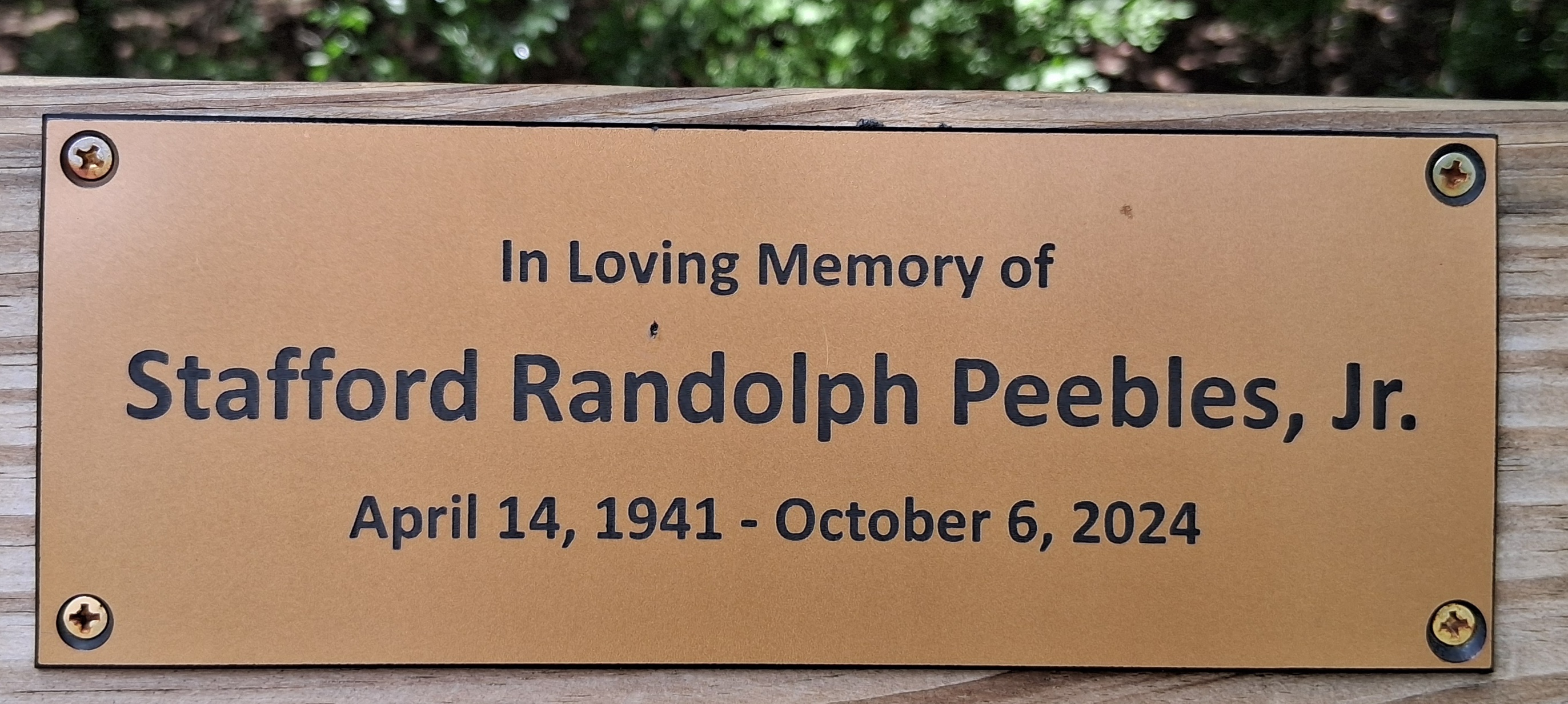
SE Hanes Park, 2026

==== Bridges of Hanes Park ====
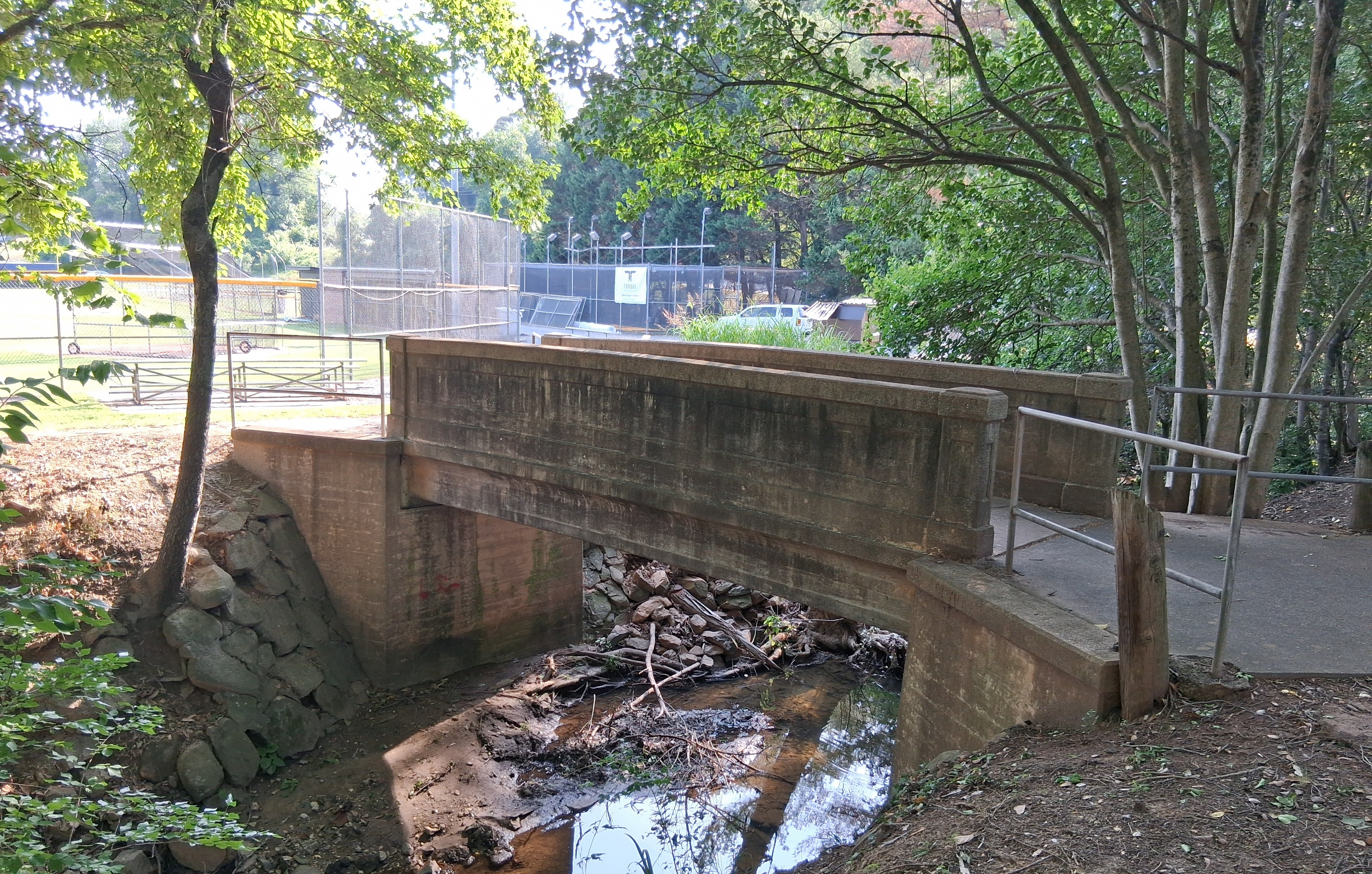
Ballfield bridge at Hanes Park. This bridge serviced what was originally the parking lot for the baseball diamond

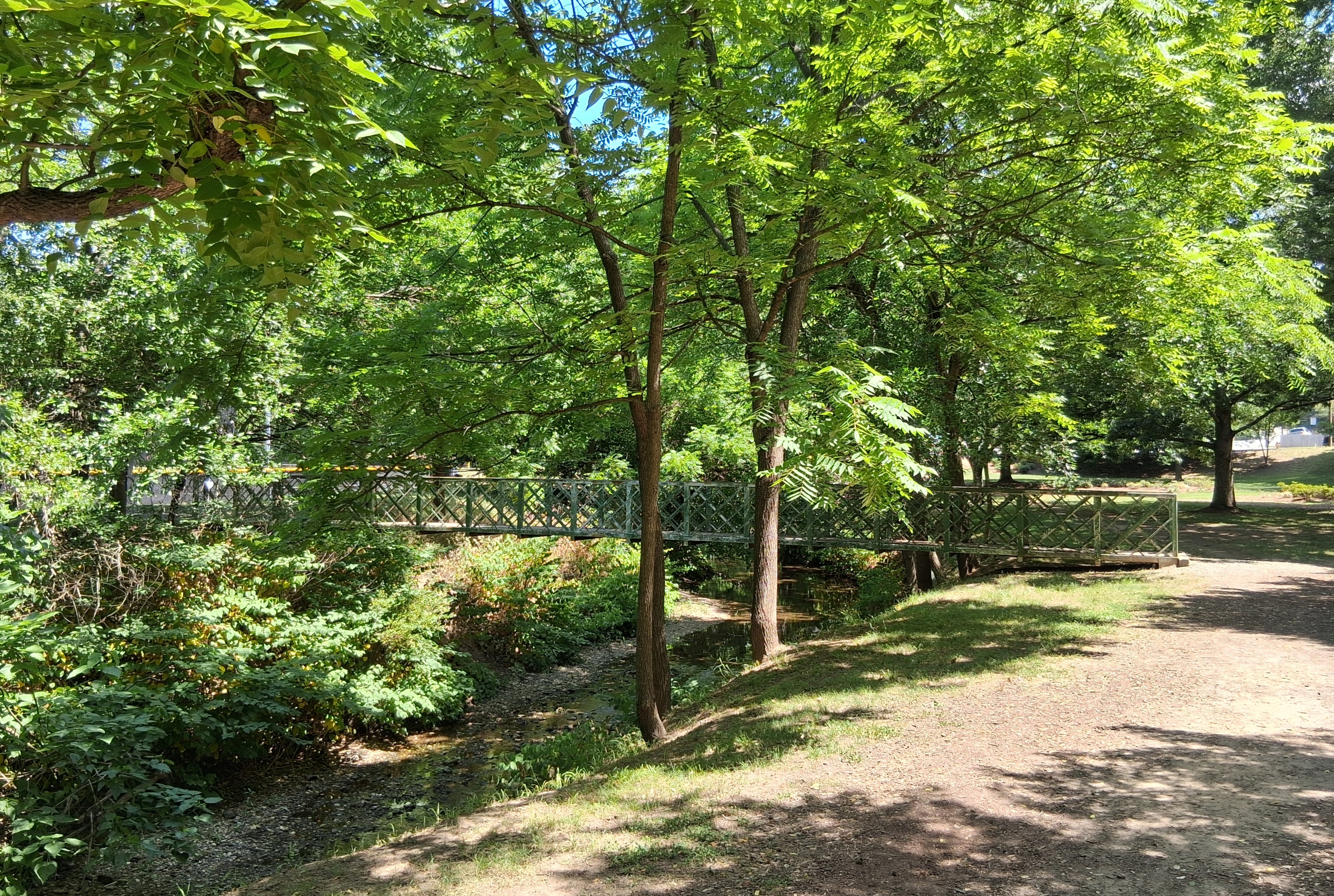
West End bridge over Peters Creek, NE Hanes Park, 2026

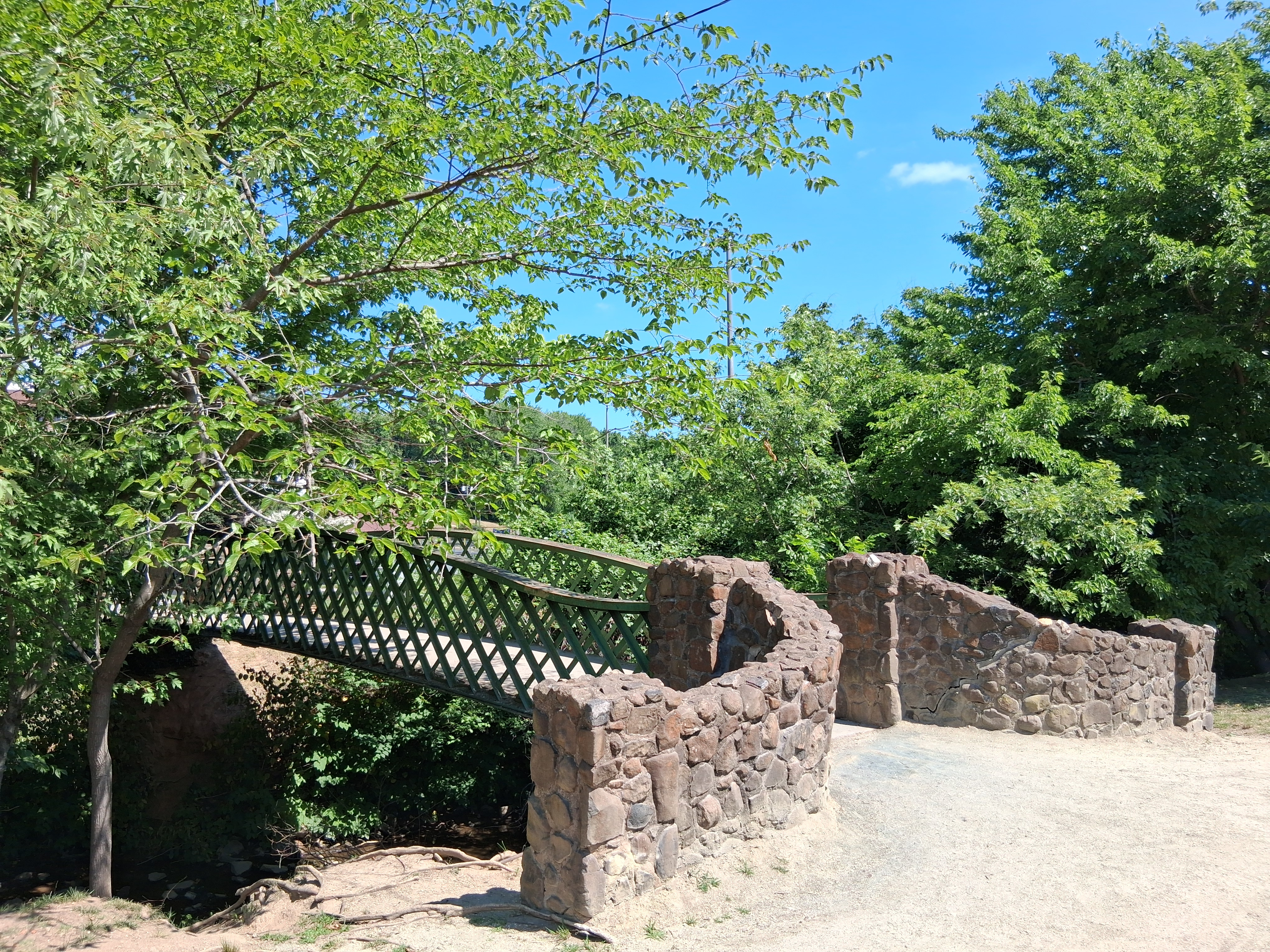
Hanes Park primary corridor bridge, 2026

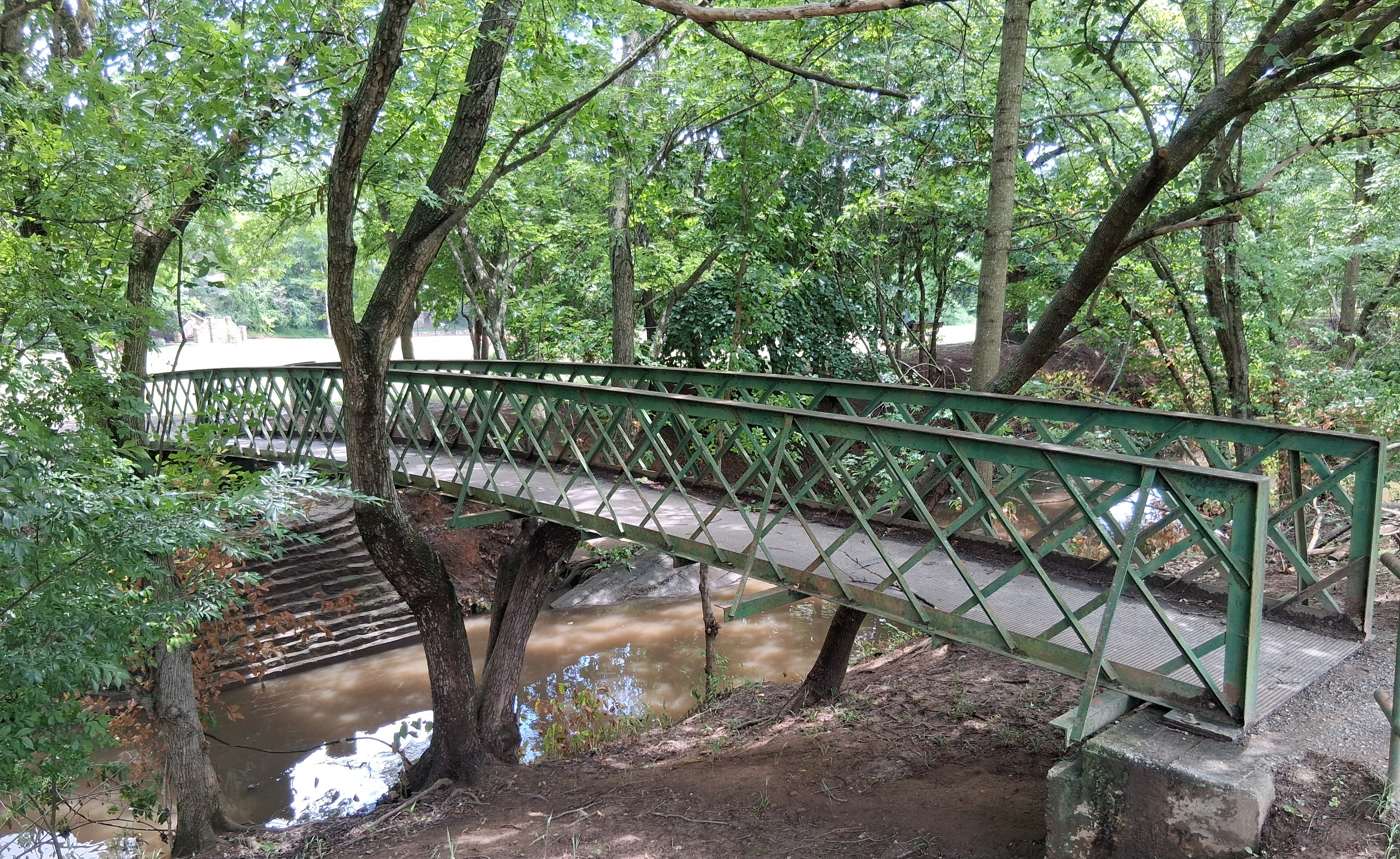
Hanes Park Southern bridge. This bridge was washed downstream in July 1931

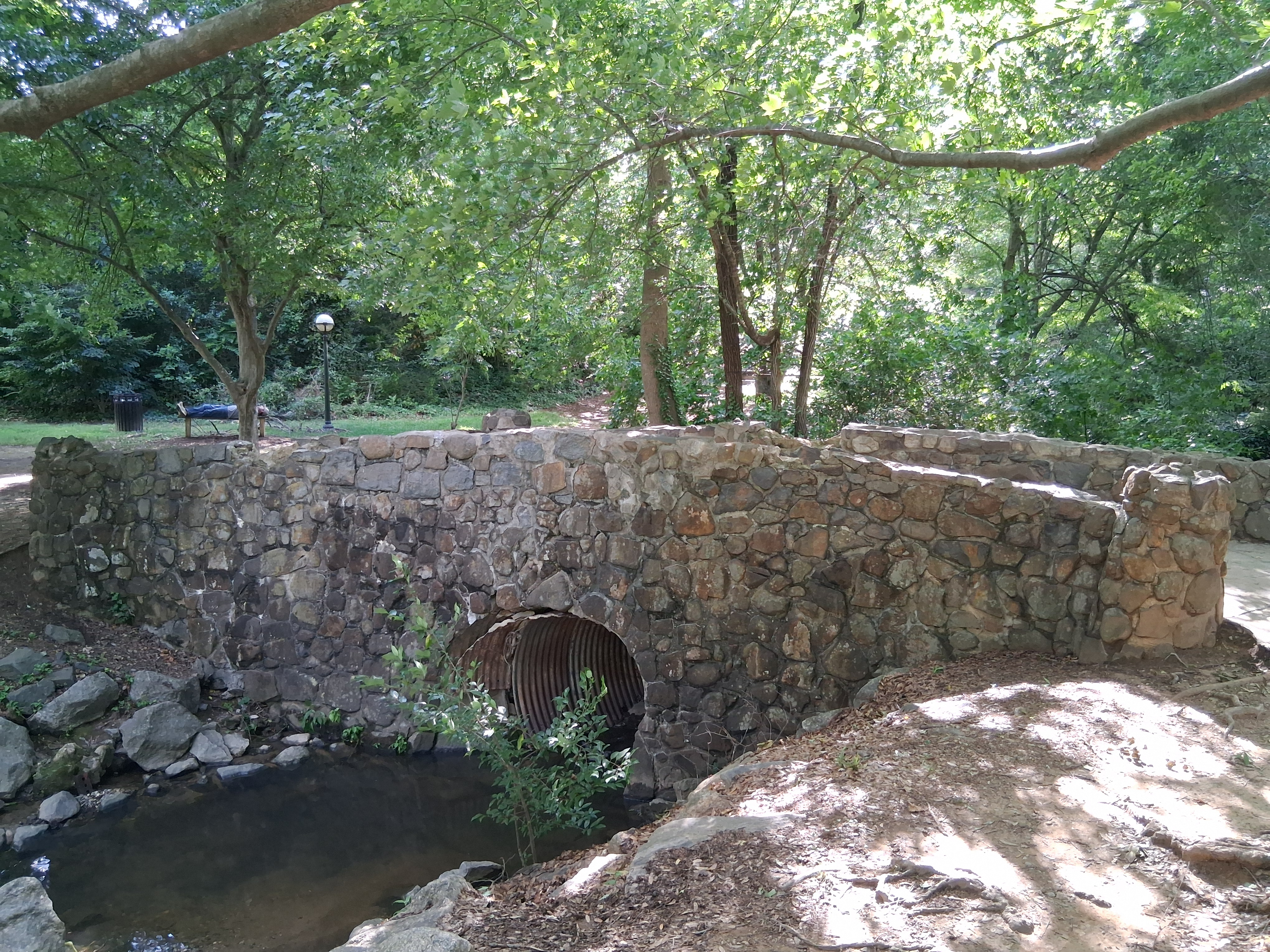
Cobble masonry arch bridge, SW corner of Hanes Park

== Photo gallery ==
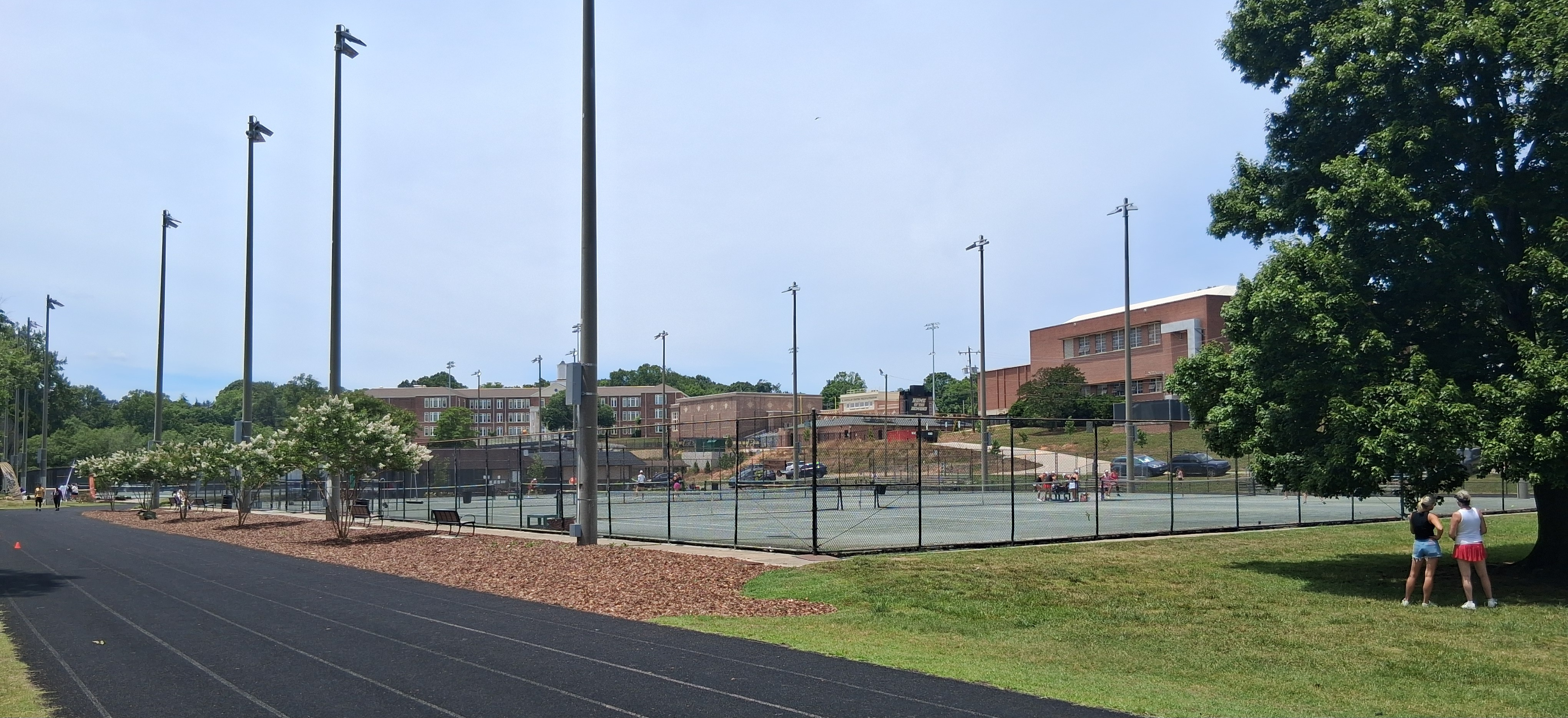
Central Hanes Park, Summer 2026. M. Crater Field and Stadium can be seen at center in the distance

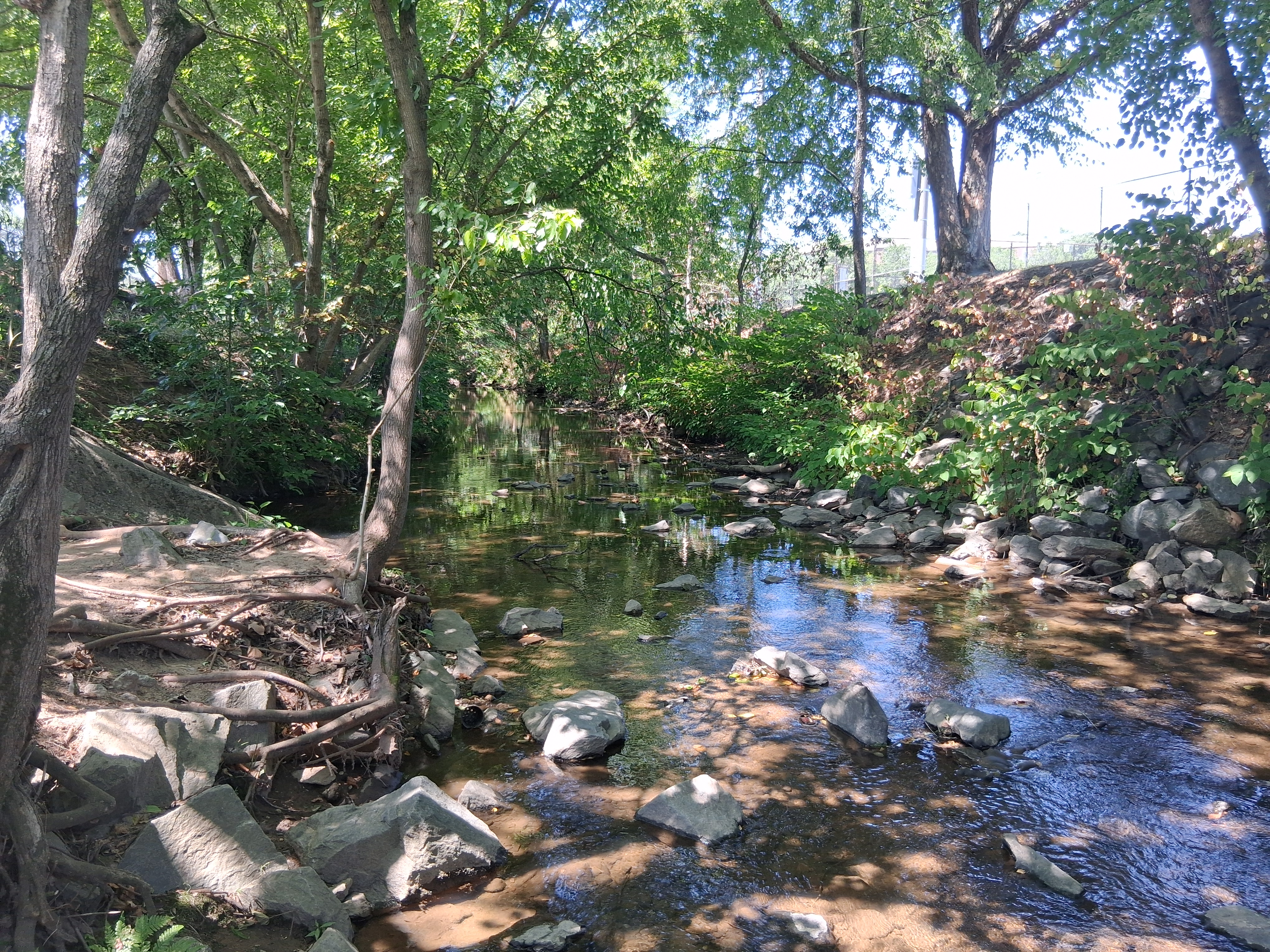
Peters Creek in Hanes Park

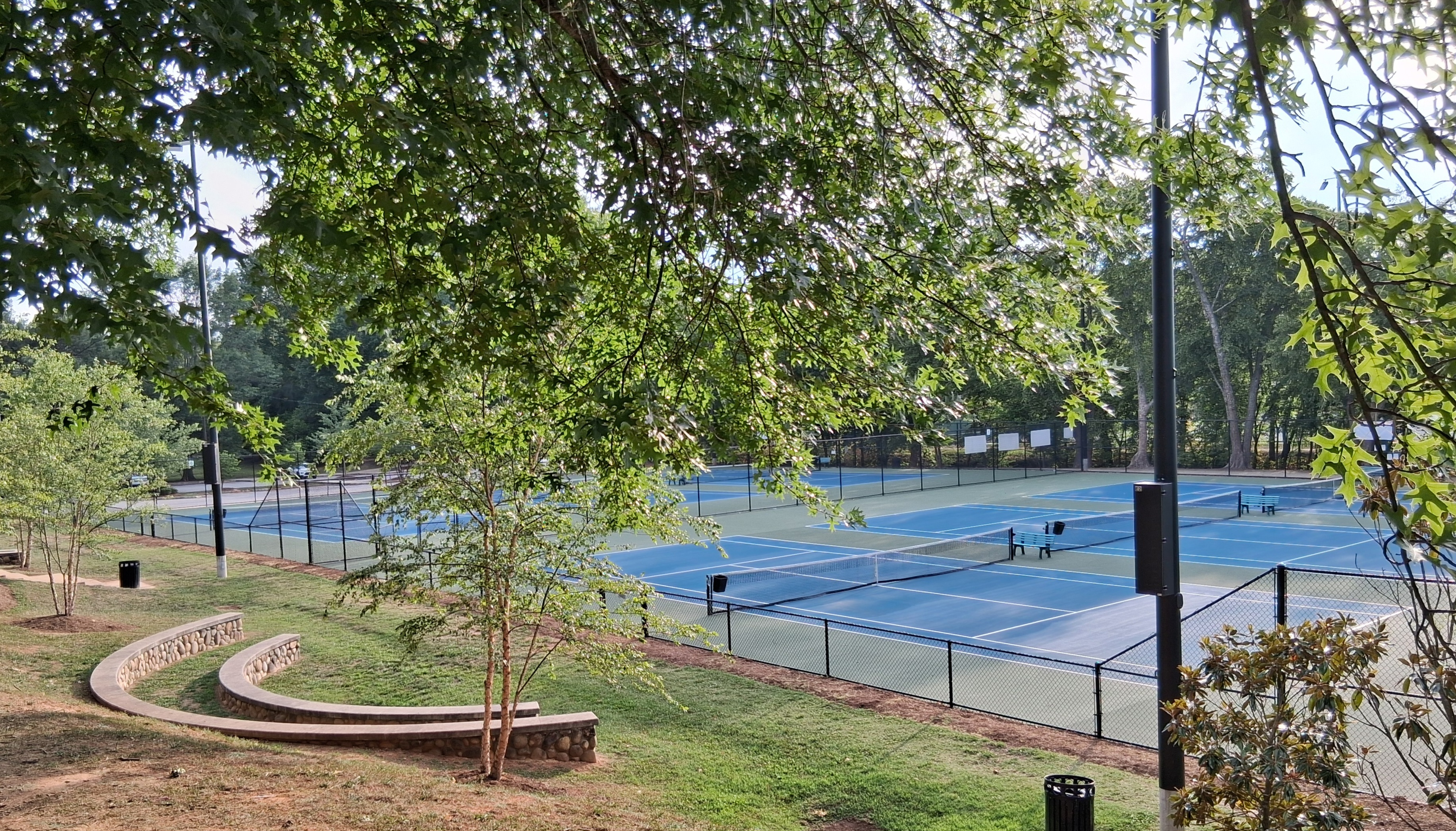
Hanes Park acrylic courts, 2026

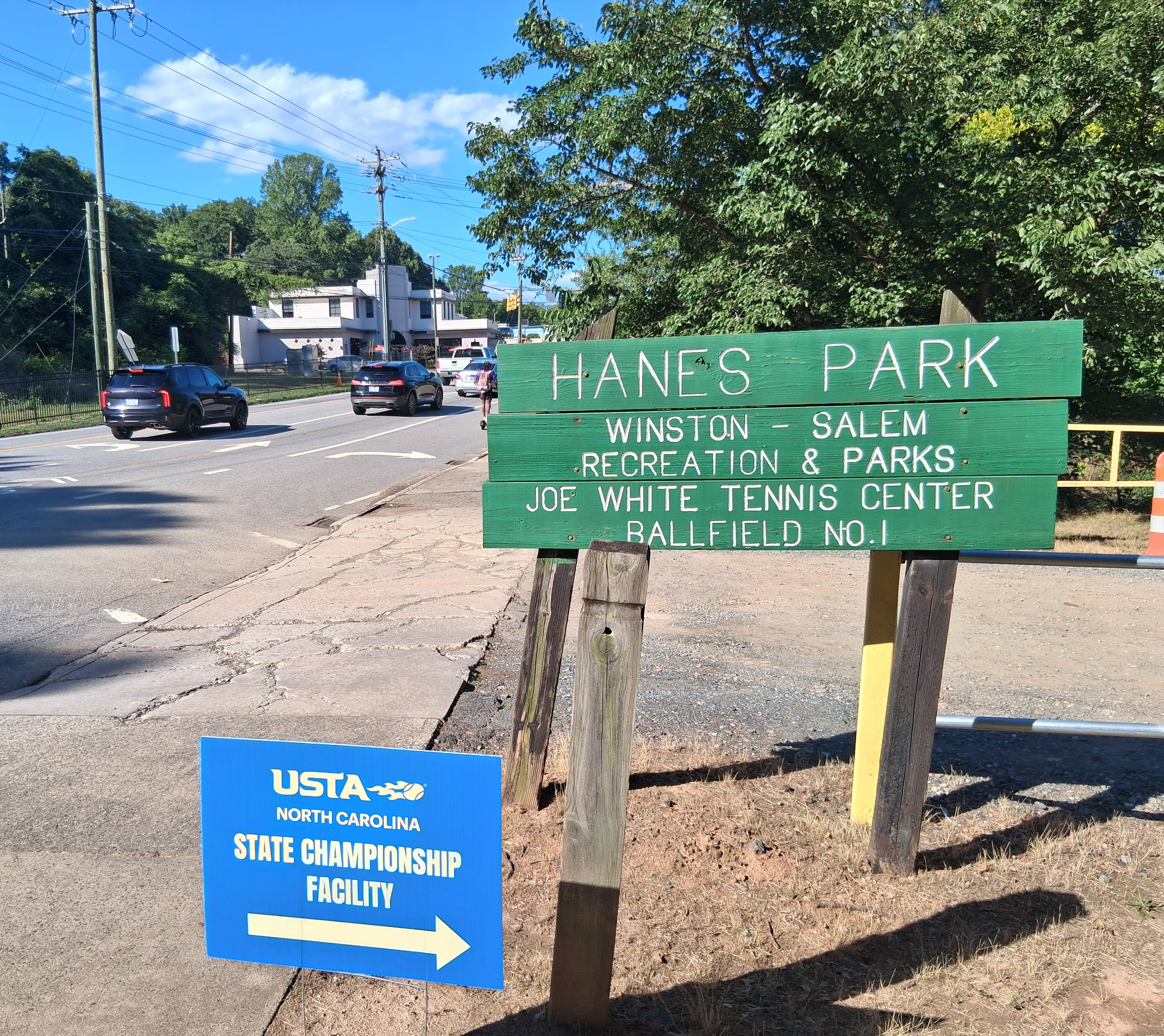
1404 W Northwest Boulevard entrance to Hanes Park

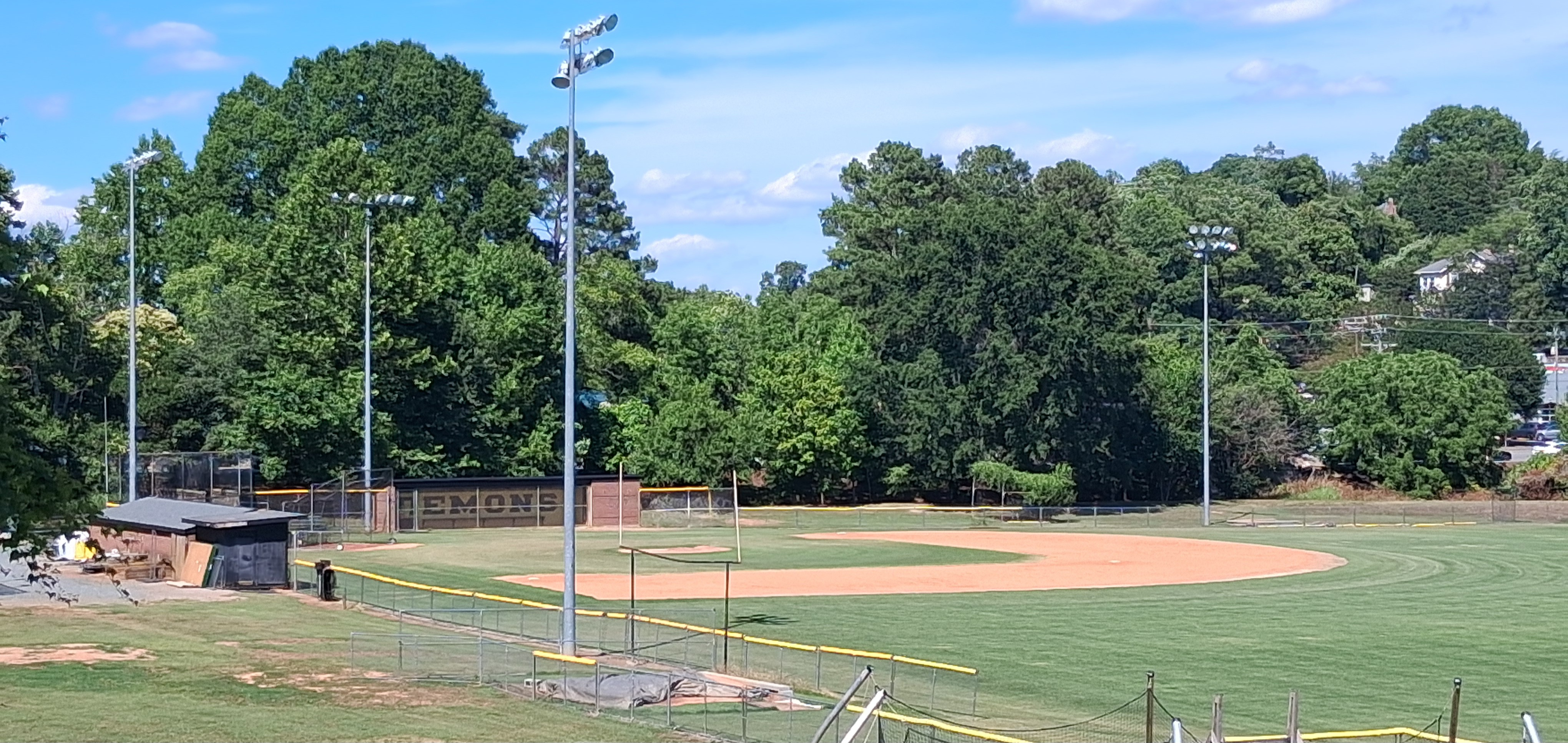
R. J. Reynolds H.S. baseball diamond, NW corner of Hanes Park

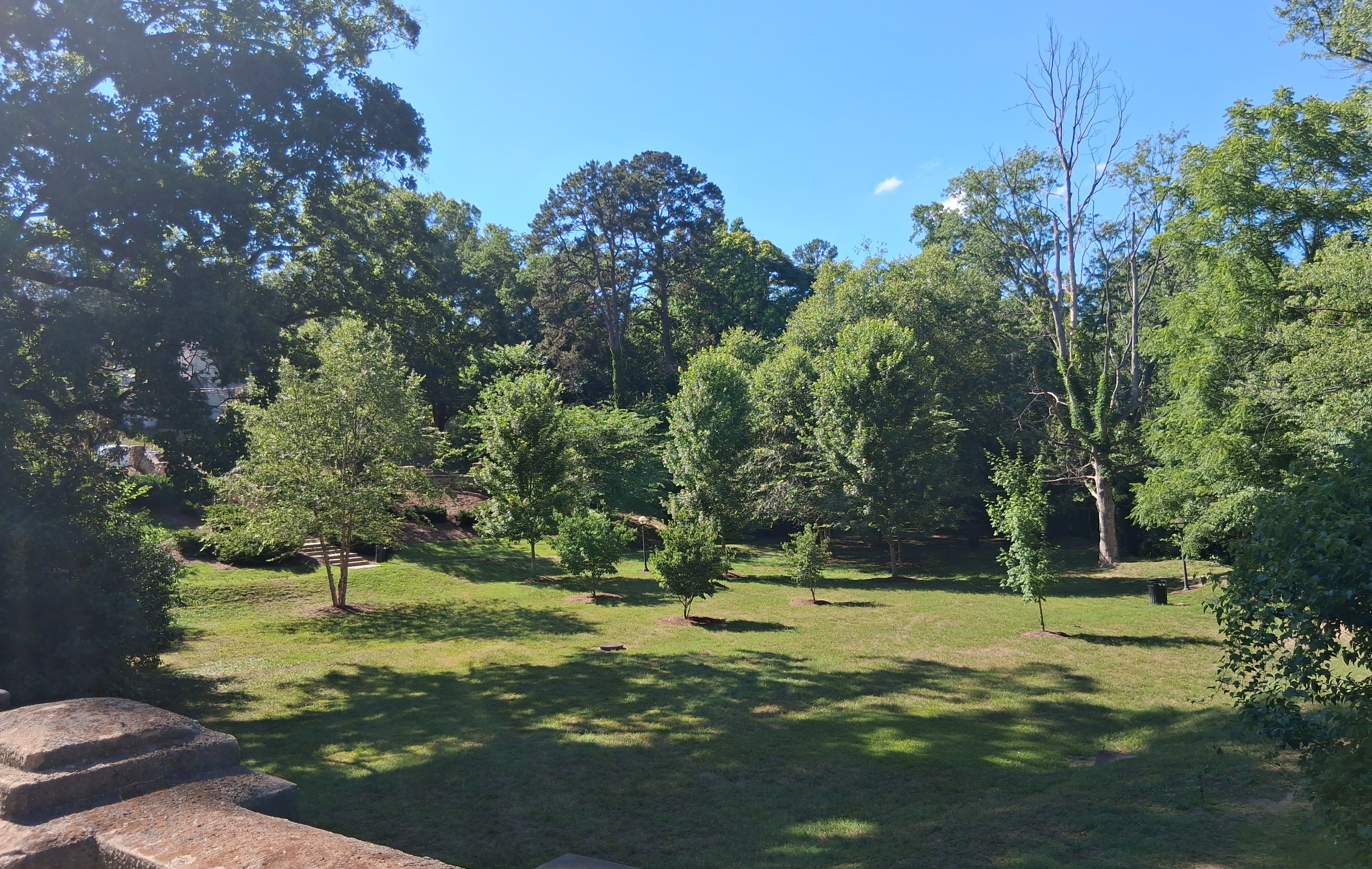
SW corner of Hanes Park as seen from the Glade Street bridge

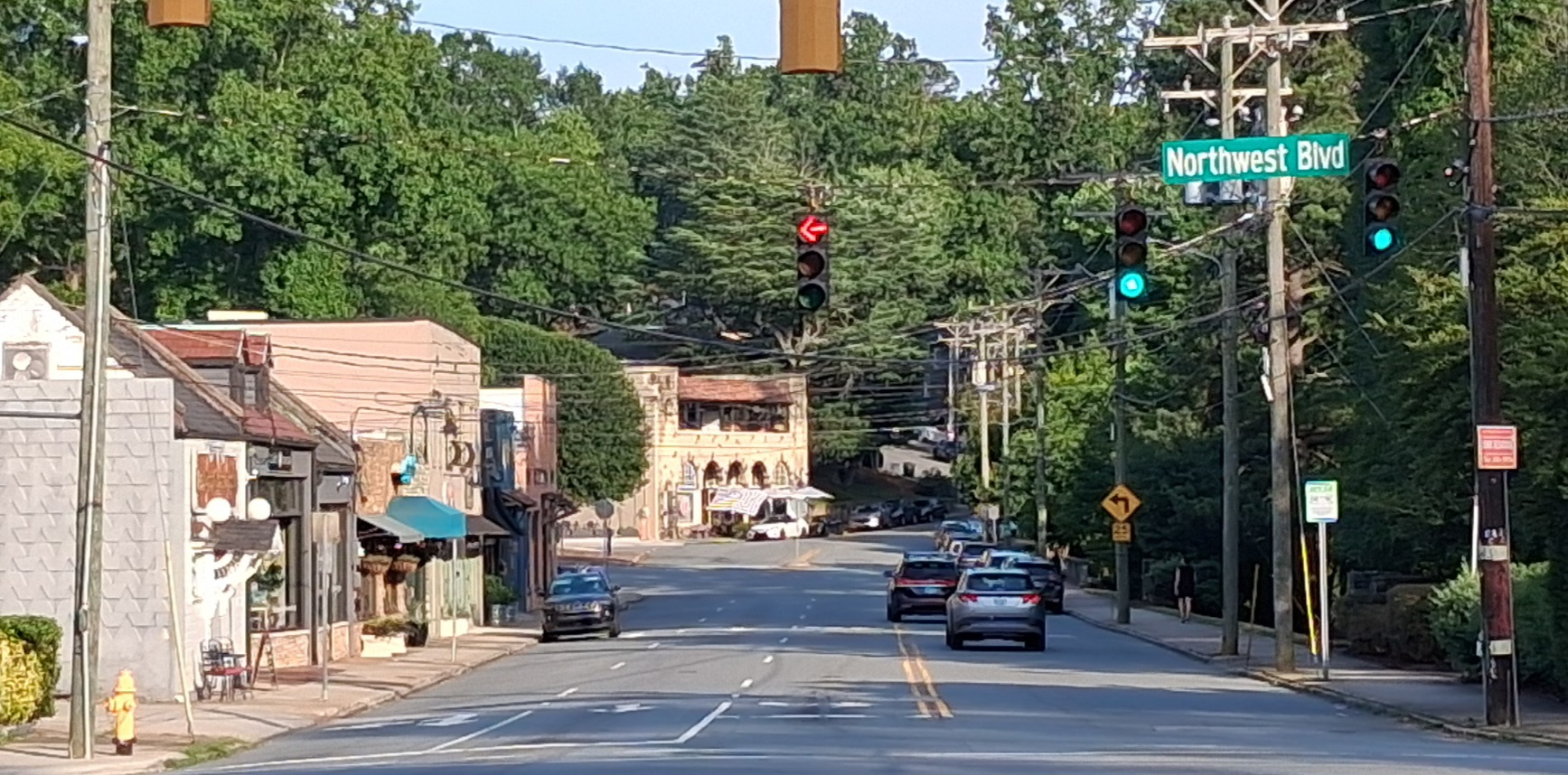
Reynolda Road on a Sunday, 2026. This corridor serves as the northern boundary to Hanes Park

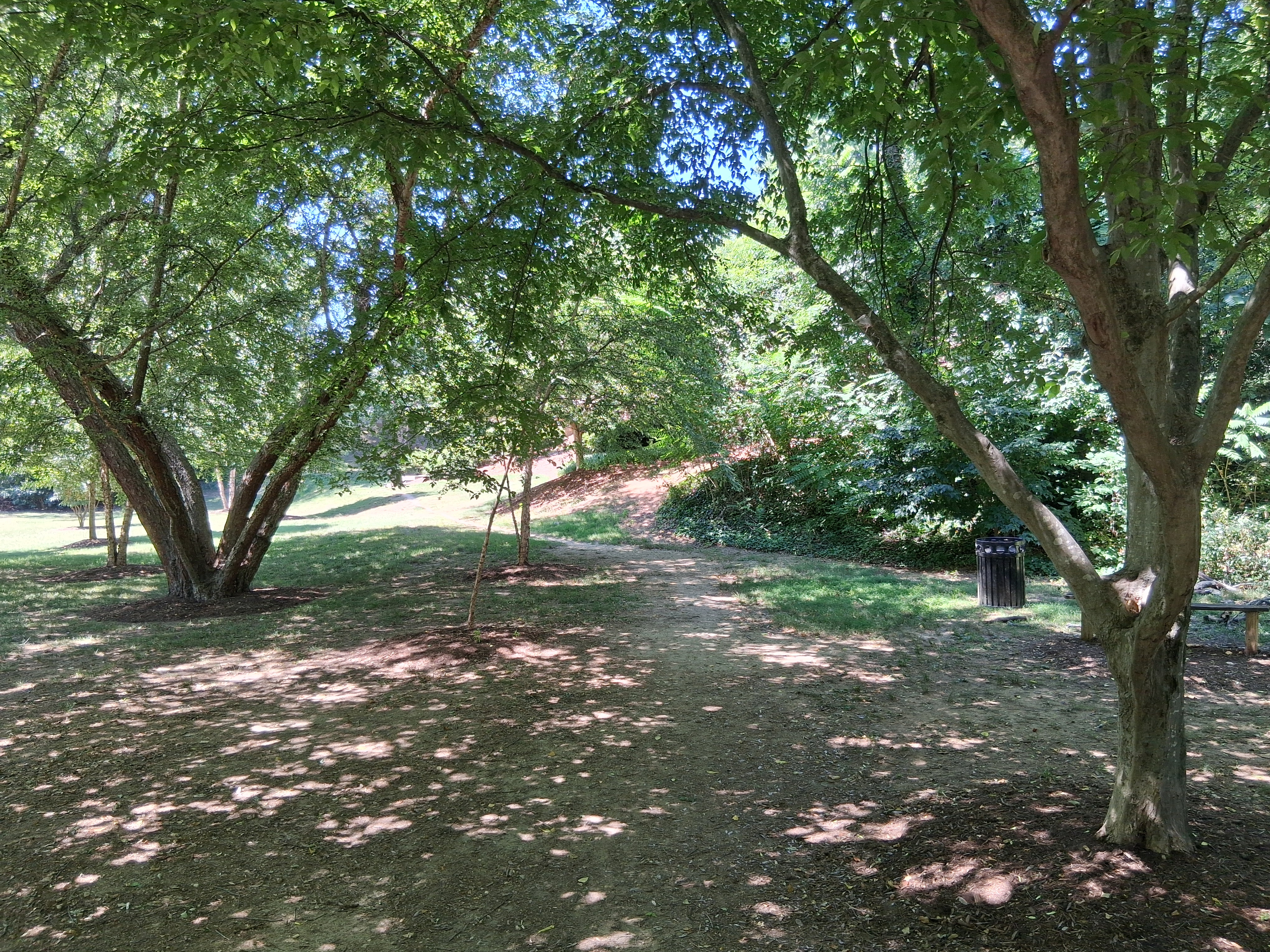
Walking trail in the SW corner of Hanes Park

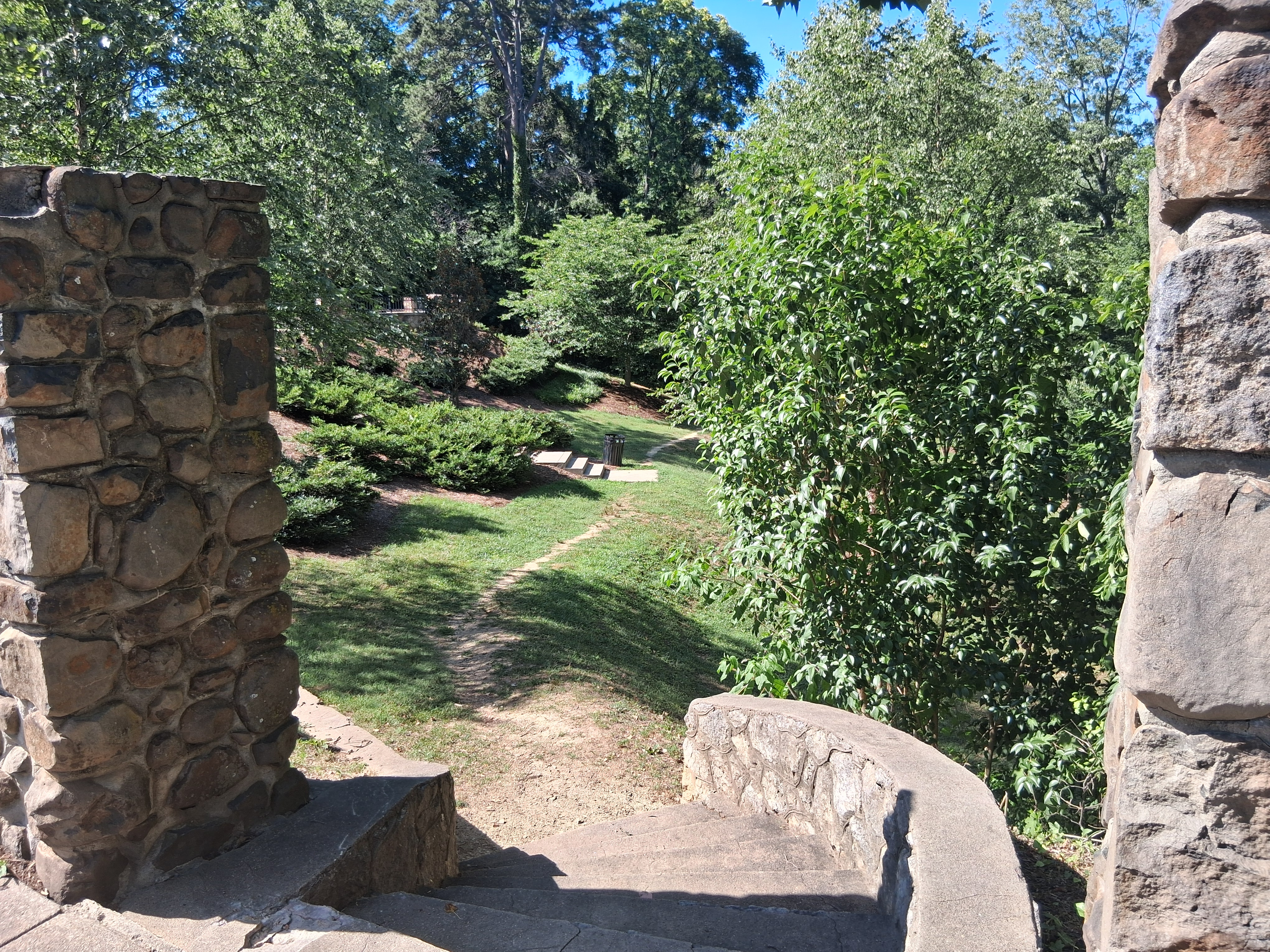
Hanes Park SW corner entry steps, 2026. These granite steps were constructed in 1937, after the original set washed-out in a storm

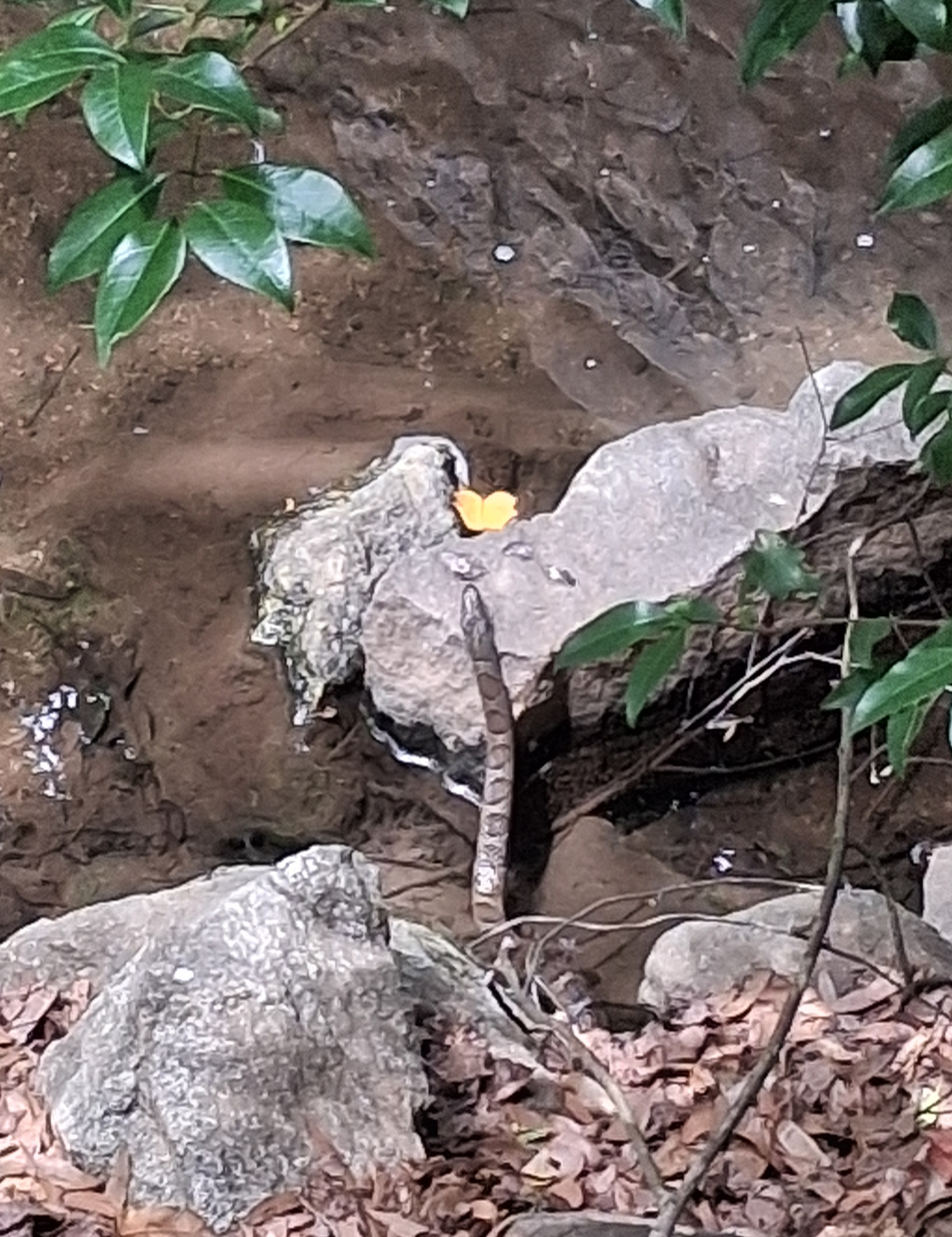
Copperhead snake in Peters Creek

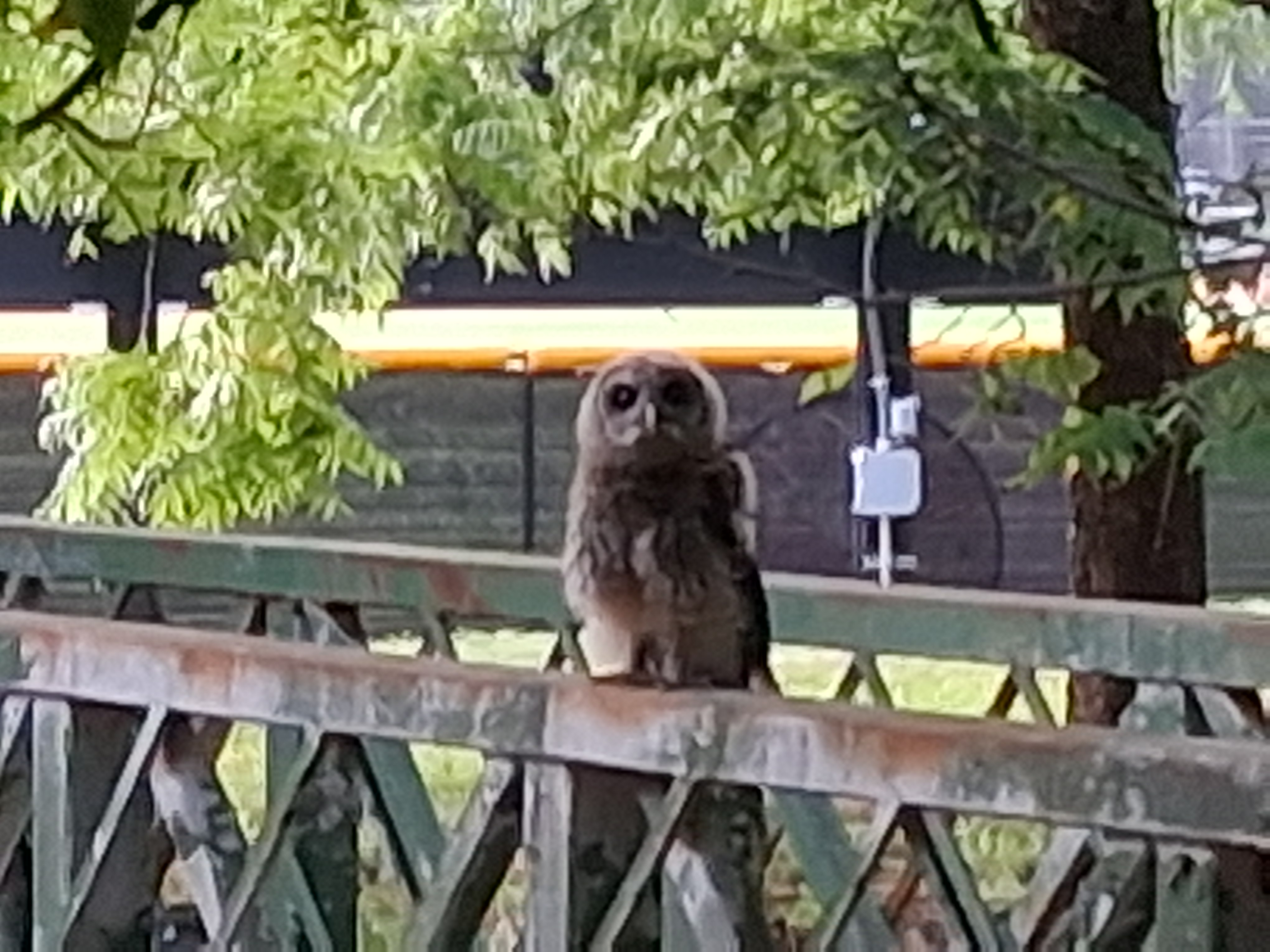
Barred Owl in Hanes Park, Summer 2026
